= List of moa species =

This is a list of the bird species of the order Dinornithiformes.

== Emeidae ==
=== Pachyornis ===
- †Pachyornis elephantopus
- †Pachyornis geranoides
- †Pachyornis australis

=== Euryapteryx ===
- †Euryapteryx curtus

=== Emeus ===
- †Emeus crassus

=== Anomalopteryx ===
- †Anomalopteryx didiformis

== Dinornithidae ==
=== Dinornis ===
- †Dinornis novaezealandiae
- †Dinornis robustus

== Megalapterygidae ==
=== Megalapteryx ===
- †Megalapteryx didinus
