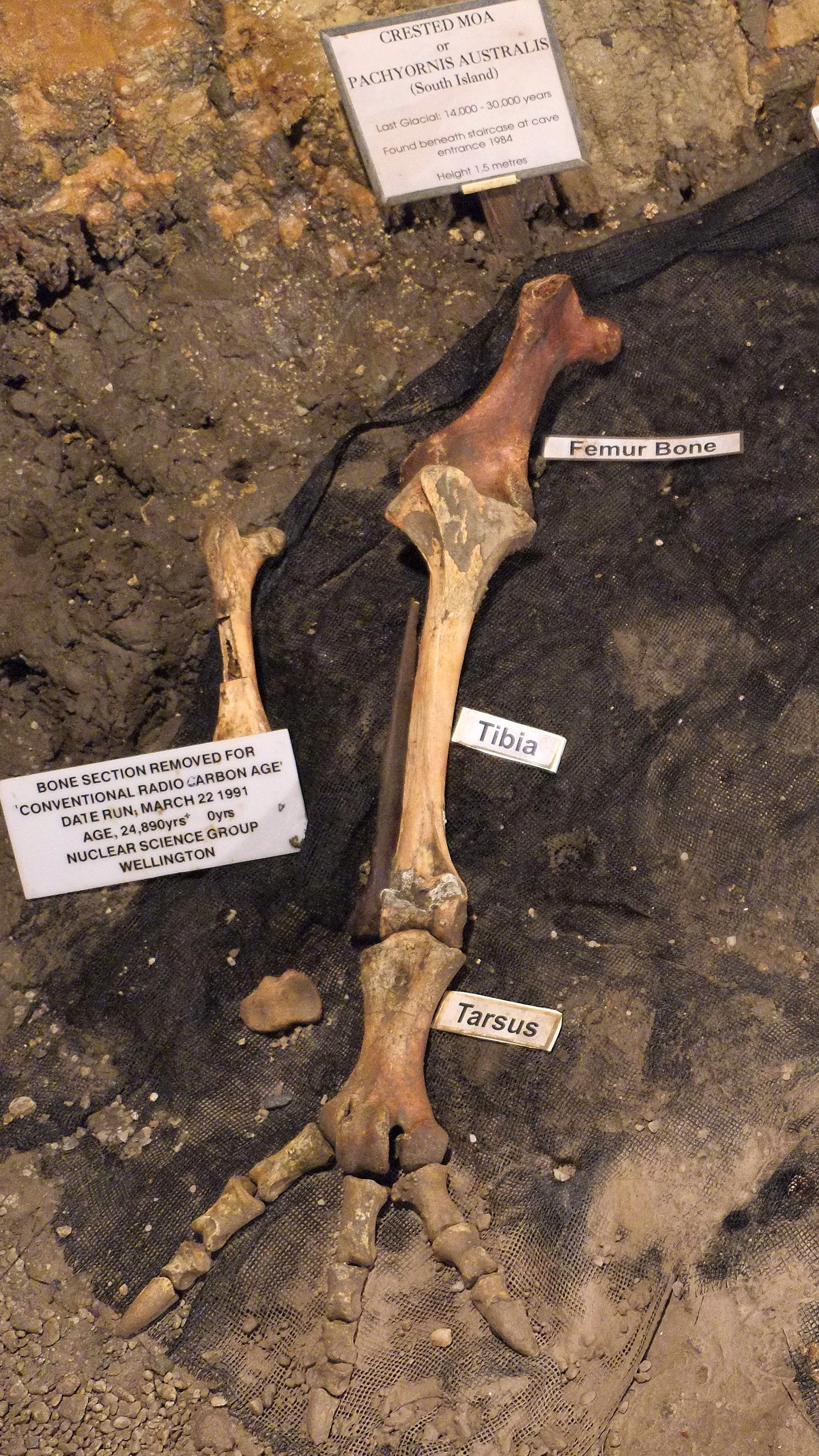
- Pachyornis australis bones in Ngārua Caves

Conservation status
- Extinct

Scientific classification
- Kingdom: Animalia
- Phylum: Chordata
- Class: Aves
- Infraclass: Palaeognathae
- Order: †Dinornithiformes
- Family: †Emeidae
- Genus: †Pachyornis
- Species: †P. australis

Binomial name
- †Pachyornis australis (Oliver, 1949)

Synonyms
- List: Pachyornis elephantopus Cracraft 1976 non (Owen 1856) Lydekker 1891; Mesopteryx sp. β Parker 1895

= Crested moa =

Crested moa Temporal range: Late Holocene

Extinct species of bird

The crested moa (Pachyornis australis) is an extinct species of moa. It is one of the 9 known species of moa to have existed.

Moa are grouped together with emus, ostriches, kiwi, cassowaries, rheas, and tinamous in the clade Palaeognathae. Some of the species of this group are flightless and lacks a keel on their sternum. The name crested moa is due to pits being found in their skulls, suggesting they had crests of long feathers. These cranial pits are also found occasionally in Dinornis, Anomalopteryx, and other Pachyornis species.

== Description ==
The crested moa weighed around 75 kg (165 lb). The crested moa was smaller than the heavy-footed moa (Pachyornis elephantopus) and their bones are sometimes mistaken for those of P. elephantopus due to their similar structure.

Almost nothing is known about the feather pits on the crested moa's skull. It is likely the feathers were used in courtship rituals or to challenge rivals, but no feathers have been found, so their colour or size can only be speculated at.

== Distribution and habitat ==
The crested moa was endemic to the South Island of New Zealand, where it occupied the high altitude sub-alpine forests in the North West, particularly in the Nelson area. Crested moa remains have been found in the Honeycomb Hills Cave and other caves in the vicinity. It was the ecological equivalent of the heavy-footed moa in the subalpine zone. While their remains have occasionally been found together, the heavy-footed moa generally preferred warmer and drier lowland areas. However, it is likely the crested moa would have migrated from the high country to these more hospitable areas in winter.

== Ecology and diet ==
As with all moa species, the crested moa filled the role of large herbivores in New Zealand, where there are no native terrestrial mammals (excluding bats). The robust beak with a pointed tip, sturdy jaws, together with large numbers of gizzard stones suggests the diet of Pachyornis was high in fibrous plant material such as branches of trees and shrubs. The only real threat of predation came from the Haast's eagle (Hieraaetus moorei).

== Extinction ==
Until recently it was thought that the crested moa became extinct at the Pleistocene-Holocene transition roughly 10,000 years ago (10,000 years BP) during a period of significant climatic upheaval. In 2012 however radiocarbon dating of crested moa remains from Bulmer Cavern showed that the specimen died between 1396 and 1442 AD, over 100 years after humans first settled on the Island. During the climatic changes before the settlers arrived, the crested moa followed the changes in elevation of their sub-alpine habitats with little change in their population size. Despite their relatively low numbers and limited habitat range, their extinction came later than all of the other moa species. Given that there is no evidence that crested moa were ever hunted by humans (unlike every other species of moa), it seems likely that their populations were too isolated and remote to have been accessed by humans. Instead, it is probable that the crested moa were wiped out by introduced mammals.
