= Ngārua Caves =

New Zealand limestone caves

Coordinates: 41°01′07″S 172°54′06″E

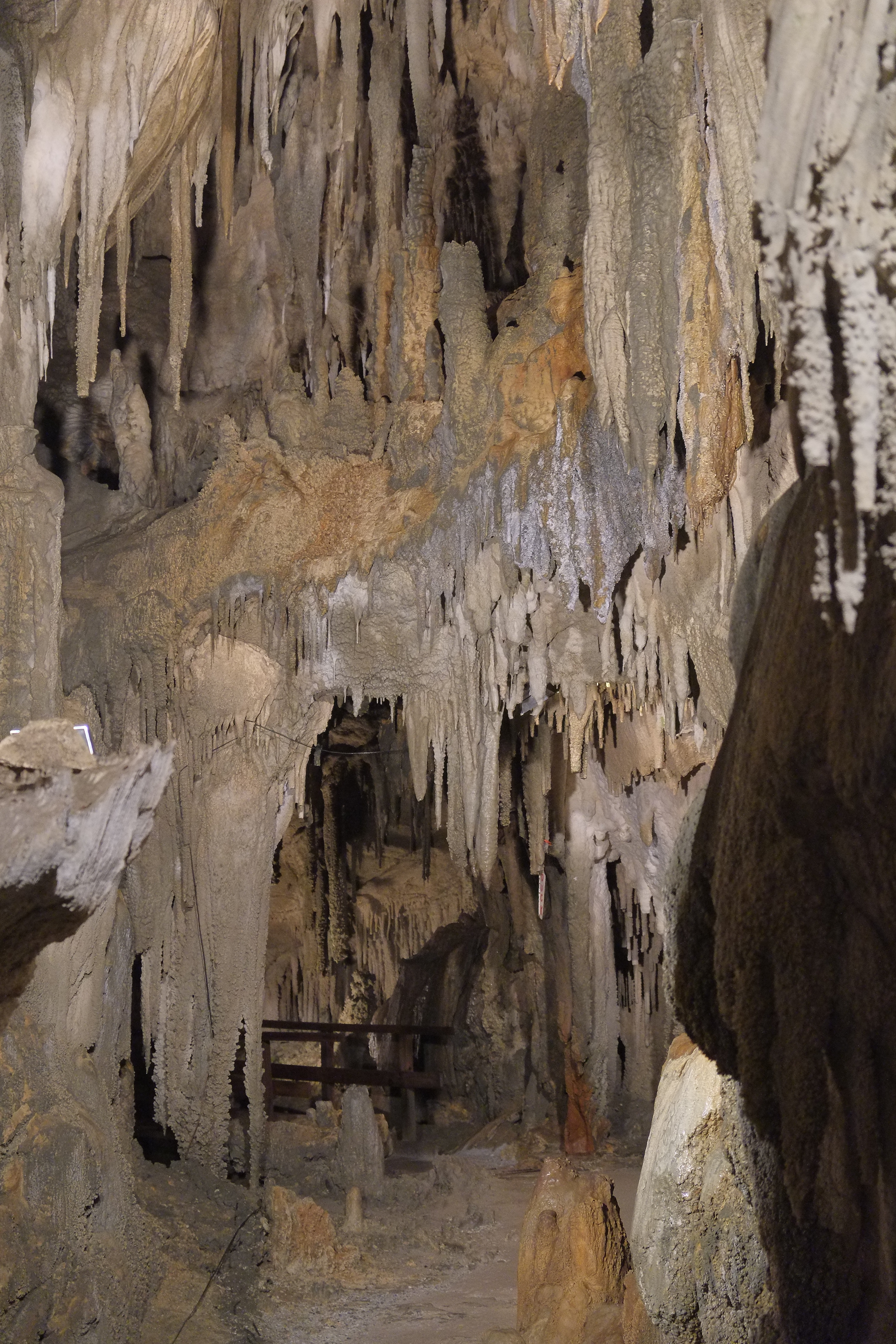
Stalactites above walkway through Ngārua Caves

The Ngārua Caves are a series of limestone caves in the Tākaka Hill range south of Abel Tasman National Park.

The caves are located close to Takaka Hill's summit, adjacent to State Highway 60 as it winds its way over the Takaka Hill between Motueka and Upper Takaka. Scheduled tours suitable for people of all ages are provided by a commercial operator from the car park and cafe situated at the cave entrance. The caves cannot be visited unattended.

Ngārua Caves contain a variety of cave formations along a comfortable 300 metres (980 ft) walkway through the caves, as well as notable displays of Moa bones remaining in the caves. Ngārua Caves is listed as one of the "101 Must-Do's for Kiwis".

== See also ==
- Caving in New Zealand
