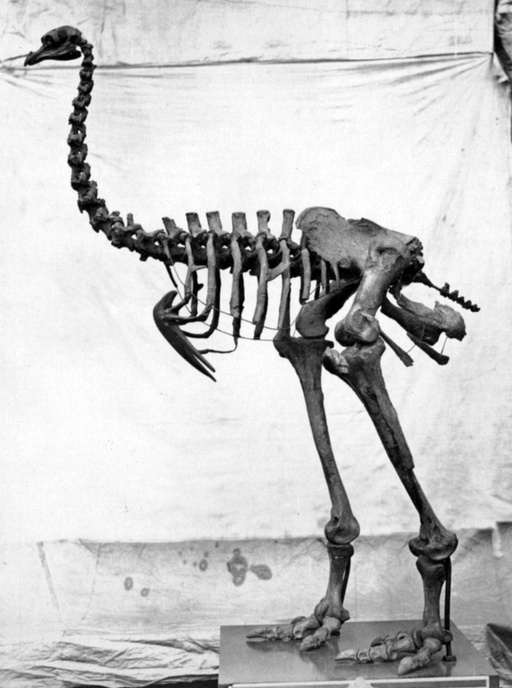
- P. elephantopus skeleton photographed by Roger Fenton

Scientific classification
- Kingdom: Animalia
- Phylum: Chordata
- Class: Aves
- Infraclass: Palaeognathae
- Order: †Dinornithiformes
- Family: †Emeidae
- Genus: †Pachyornis (Lydekker, 1891)

Type species
- Pachyornis geranoides (Owen, 1848)

Species
- Pachyornis elephantopus; Pachyornis australis; Pachyornis new lineage A? (undescribed taxon); Pachyornis new lineage B? (undescribed taxon)

= Pachyornis =

Pachyornis Temporal range: Late Pleistocene-Holocene

Extinct genus of birds

Pachyornis (from Ancient Greek παχύς (pakhús), meaning "thick", and ὄρνις (órnis), meaning "bird") is an extinct genus of ratites from New Zealand which belongs to the moa family. Like all ratites, Pachyornis is a flightless bird with a sternum that lacks a keel. They also have a distinctive palate. The genus currently contains three recognised species: the type species, Pachyornis geranoides, P. elephantopus and P. australis. Two distinct genetic lineages, one each recovered from the North and South Island, could possibly expand this number to five in the future.

The three species of Pachyornis are the most stoutly built and heavy-legged across all species of Dinornithiformes, the species that exhibits the most extreme morphology of the genus is the heavy-footed moa P. elephantopus. Pachyornis was generally similar to the eastern moa of the genus Emeus or the broad-billed moa of the genus Euryapteryx, but differed in having a pointed bill and being more heavyset. At least one species, P. australis, is assumed to have had a crest of long feathers on its head.

The species went extinct following human colonization of New Zealand, with the possible exception of P. australis, which may have already been extinct by then.

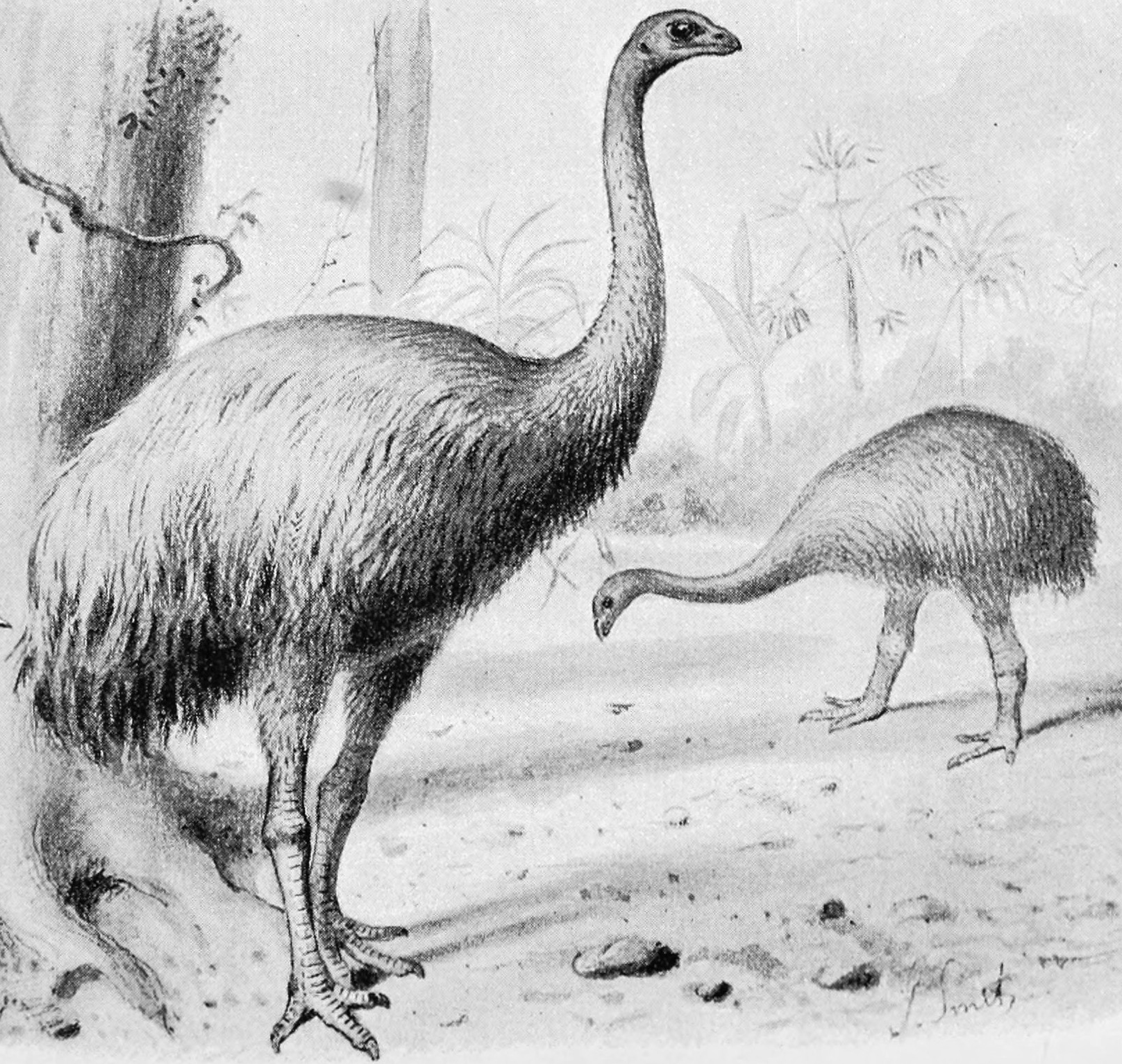
Restoration of Dinornis giganteus and Pachyornis elephantopus, both from South Island

== Bibliography ==
- Lydekker, Richard (2006) [1891]. "Genus Pachyornis". Catalogue of the Fossil Birds in the British Museum (Natural History). London, UK: Adamant Media Corporation. p. 318. ISBN 0-543-95778-0.
- Worthy, Trevor H. (2005). "Rediscovery of the types of Dinornis curtus Owen and Palapteryx geranoides Owen, with a new synonymy (Aves: Dinornithiformes)". Tuhinga. 16 (16): 33–43. doi:10.3897/tuhinga.16.e34156.
