= Ōtira Glaciation =

Last glaciation in New Zealand

The Ōtira Glaciation was the last glaciation event to occur in New Zealand occurring during the Pleistocene epoch around 75,000 to 14,000 years ago. There are three recognized episodes of glacial advancement known as the Otarama (early), Blackwater (middle) and Poulter (late) advances.

Remnants of moraines from the eastern regions of the South Island show that ice from this glaciation has once reached the top of the Canterbury Plains. An extensive ice cap appears to have developed on Fiordland with glaciers rounding the summits of the mountains and scouring deep valleys that are well below sea level. Large amounts of ice from Fiordland would also filled South islands Te Anau and Manapōuri basins which would host large lakes. Fluvial terraces located in the Rangitīkei River of Rangitīkei Valley were formed during the Ōtira Glaciation spanning the Marine Isotope Stages 2–4.

Forest cover during the Ōtira Glaciation, especially the latter parts of it, was significantly reduced with treeless barren landscapes. However mixed forest communities survived in the far northern regions of the North Island. These forest communities did not suffer from substantial losses and contained kauri, podocarp and angiosperm trees.

== Timeline ==
There are three recognized glacial advancment episodes of the Ōtira Glaciation with each episode being separated by intervals of major deglaciation. These advances are known as the Otarama (early), Blackwater (middle) and Poulter (late) advances. Each interval of glacial advancement is recognized by distinctive end moraines and trains of outwashed gravel located down-valley. These trains form gently slopping surfaces that have been cut into and partly removed by the subsequent stream erosion.

The greatest advances to occur during the late Ōtira glacial, known as the later Kumara-2 (K22) advance, began some time prior to 22,300 years before present (BP). It would culminate shortly after 18,600 years BP. Evidence for the area the ice covered can be seen from moraine ridges that built up along the glaciers edge. Data from pollen during this time indicate that the landscape and conditions of Grey Valley, north Westland were bleak and barren without trees. The ice limit was only 25 kilometers in front. Kumara-2 would be subsequently followed by the Kumara-3 advances that would end around 14,000 years BP from rapid degradation.
