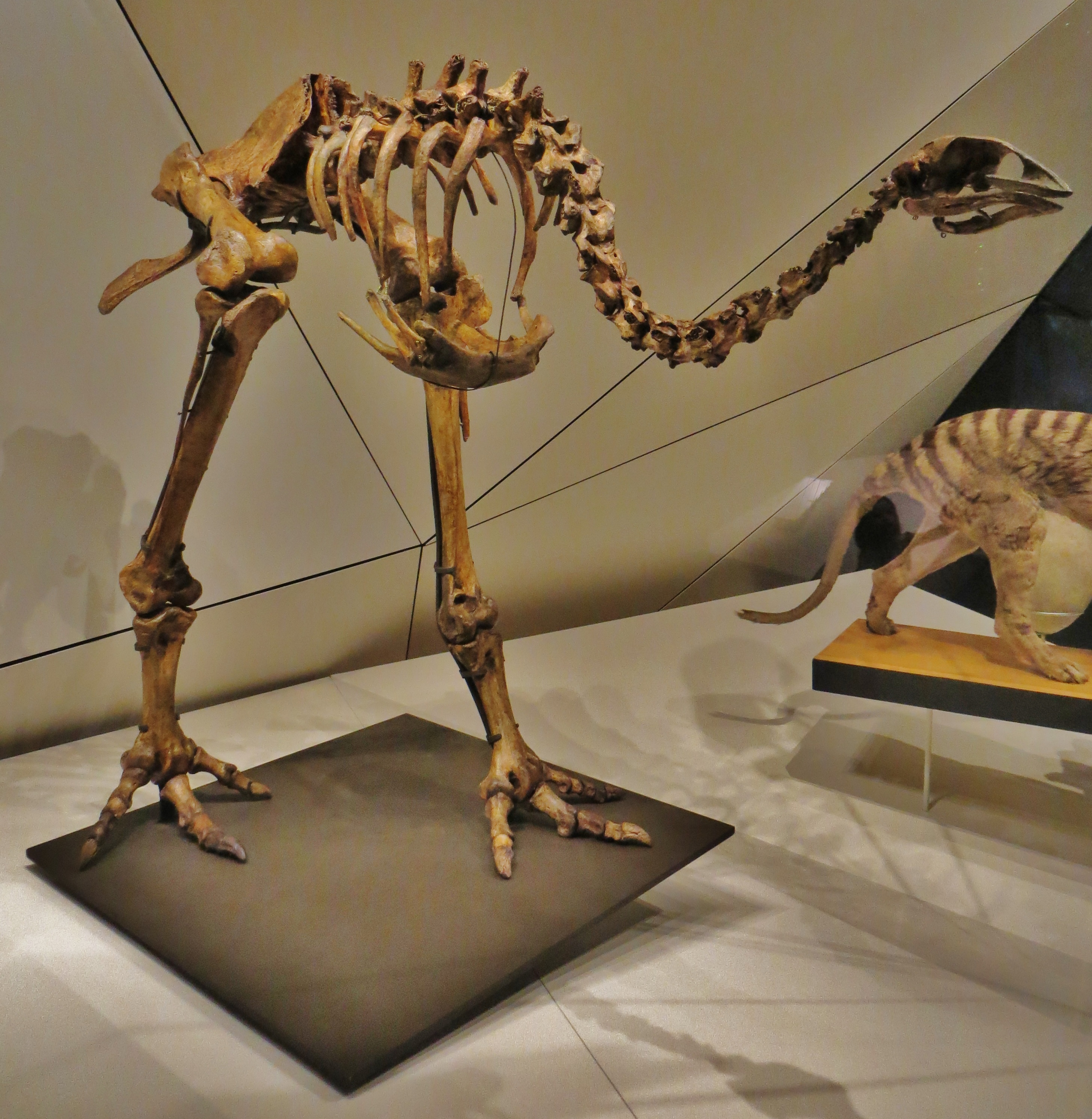
- Skeleton of the eastern moa (Emeus crassus) in Musee des Confluences, Lyon

Scientific classification
- Kingdom: Animalia
- Phylum: Chordata
- Class: Aves
- Infraclass: Palaeognathae
- Order: †Dinornithiformes
- Family: †Emeidae (Bonaparte, 1854)

Type species
- Emeus crassus (Owen, 1846) Reichenbach 1853 non Parker 1895

Genera
- Anomalopteryx; Emeus; Euryapteryx; Pachyornis

= Lesser moa =

Lesser moa Temporal range: Pleistocene-Holocene

Family of extinct birds

The lesser moa (Note: The word “moa” is from the Māori language, and is both singular and plural. Usage in New Zealand English and in the scientific literature in recent years has been changing to reflect this.) (family Emeidae) were a family in the moa order Dinornithiformes. About two-thirds of all moa species are in the lesser moa family. The moa were ratites from New Zealand: flightless birds with a sternum but without a keel. They also have a distinctive palate. The origin of the ratites is becoming clearer as it is now believed that early ancestors of these birds were able to fly and flew to the southern areas that they have been found in.

== Species ==
Currently, six species of lesser moa are recognised, belonging to four genera. These are:

- Genus Anomalopteryx
  - Bush moa, Anomalopteryx didiformis (North and South Island, New Zealand)
- Genus Emeus
  - Eastern moa, Emeus crassus (South Island, New Zealand)
- Genus Euryapteryx
  - Broad-billed moa, Euryapteryx curtus (North and South Island, New Zealand)
- Genus Pachyornis
  - Heavy-footed moa, Pachyornis elephantopus (South Island, New Zealand)
  - Mantell's moa, Pachyornis geranoides (North Island, New Zealand)
  - Crested moa, Pachyornis australis (South Island, New Zealand)
