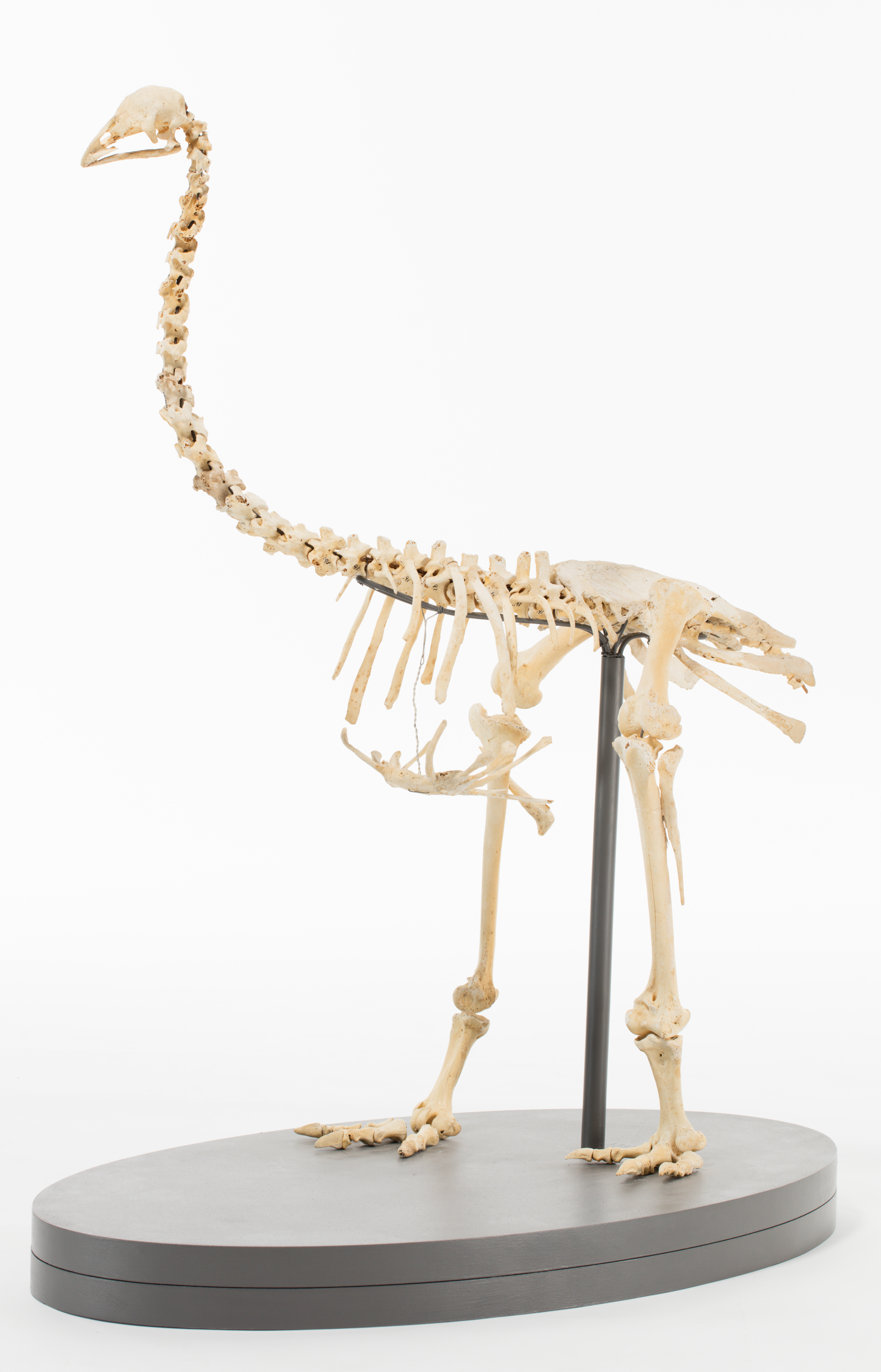
- from the collection of Auckland Museum

Conservation status
- Extinct

Scientific classification
- Kingdom: Animalia
- Phylum: Chordata
- Class: Aves
- Infraclass: Palaeognathae
- Order: †Dinornithiformes
- Family: †Emeidae
- Genus: †Pachyornis
- Species: †P. geranoides

Binomial name
- †Pachyornis geranoides (Owen, 1848)

Synonyms
- List: Palapteryx geranoides Owen, 1848 non Euryapteryx geranoides Checklist Committee 1990; Dinornis geranoides (Owen 1848) Owen 1866; Anomalopteryx geranoides (Owen 1848) Lydekker, 1891; Cela geranoides (Owen 1848) Hutton 1891; Dinornis curtus Owen 1871 non Owen 1846; Anomalopteryx curta (Owen 1871) Lydekker 1891; Pachyornis pygmaeus Hutton 1895 non Euryapteryx pygmaeus Hutton 1891; Dinornis expunctus Archey, 1927; Pachyornis septentrionalis (Oliver 1949) Brodkorb 1963; Pachyornis mappini Archey, 1941

= Mantell's moa =

Mantell's moa Temporal range: Pleistocene- Late Holocene

Extinct species of bird

Mantell's moa (Pachyornis geranoides) also known as Mappin's moa or moa ruarangi, is an extinct species of moa from the North Island of New Zealand. It inhabited lowland environments like shrublands, grasslands, dunelands, and forests. Moa are an extinct group of ratites, flightless birds with a sternum without a keel. They also have a distinctive palate.

Its name is in honour of New Zealand naturalist and politician Walter Mantell.

== Description ==
Mantell's moa had a length of 54 cm (21 in), and weighed between 17 to 36 kg (37 to 79 lb). Another estimate gives 31.8 kg for males and 51.4 kg for females. Height has been estimated at 1.11 meters.
