= List of recovering species =

Vulnerable species that recovered

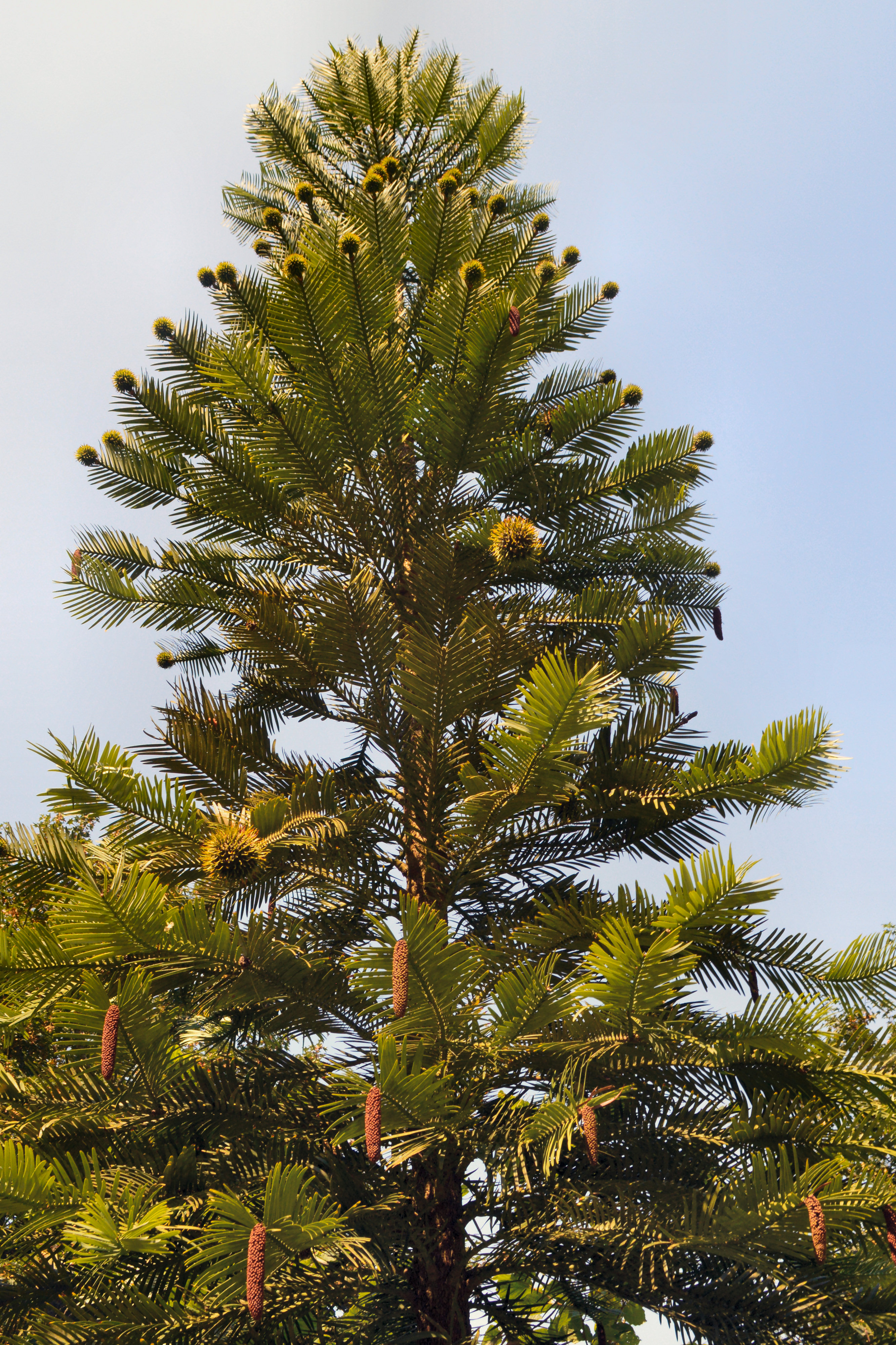
Wollemi pine (Wollemia nobilis) was discovered in Australia in 1994, and only a few dozen mature individuals exist in the wild. To guard against extinction, it is being cultivated in 30 countries around the world.

A recovering species is a species that was vulnerable to extinction, but has recovered to some extent. Recovery may be measured in a variety of ways; however, counting the population or measuring the extent of the species' range are common techniques. One technique for assessing recovery utilizes four metrics:

1. Conservation legacy: Measures the success of conservation steps taken in the past
2. Conservation dependence: Measures how self-sustaining the species is, and how reliant it is on human intervention
3. Conservation gain: Measures the likely improvement to the species' population and habitat in the future
4. Recovery potential: Measures the plausible improvement assuming sustained conservation efforts over a long period of time

A species may be deemed to be fully recovered when three goals are met:

1. Viable: The population is healthy and has a minimal risk of extinction over the long term
2. Ecologically Functional: The species is fulfilling its natural role within the ecosystem
3. Range: The species is represented across its historical range (Note: Scientists with the IUCN consider a species fully recovered "if it is viable and ecologically functional in every part of its indigenous and projected range.")

Historically, conservation efforts focused on preventing extinction rather than promoting recovery. Since 1964, the International Union for Conservation of Nature (IUCN) has maintained a Red List of species that are in danger of extinction. The metrics used in the Red List assessments typically did not incorporate prospects of recovery. In 2018, a team of scientists proposed extending the IUCN assessments with a "green list" (later changed to "green status") assessment that encompassed the likelihood of recovery. The proposal to establish the green list assessment explained one of its major purposes:

Exclusive reliance on the current IUCN Red List category of a species in funding decisions risks creating a perverse incentive for conservationists to downplay their successes and focus on the dire state of their species in order to continue to qualify for funding and garner political and practical support for future conservation actions .... In contrast, our green-list framework provides incentives for funders and decision makers to promote high conservation impact by focusing on species with high conservation dependence and high potential for conservation gain, providing a more effective means of valuing their investments.

After 2018, the IUCN began extending the Red List assessments to include recovery data, officially called the IUCN Green Status of Species. (Note: The Green Status data for a species is appended to the species' Red List web page. The Green Status data typically includes four components: Green Status Assessment Information; Indigenous and Expected Additional Range; Spatial Units; and Ecological Function.) The first batch of species with Green Status assessments were published in 2021 (Note: There were 181 unrelated species published in the first batch.) with the declaration that the Green Status "introduces a new way of thinking about conservation impact by defining conservation status in terms of progress toward species recovery".

Species listed in this article include those that were categorized by IUCN as Vulnerable (or worse) (Note: The official definitions of conservation categories such as "Vulnerable" or "Endangered" are sometimes complex. The IUCN definition of "Vulnerable", as of 2026, is found at IUCN Red List Categories and Criteria, pp. 20‍–‍22.) and have since recovered to some extent. Recoveries may be included in this list if a scientific source asserts that there has been some degree of recovery, supported with a change in conservation status or with a significant increase in population. The recovery does not need to be documented by an IUCN Green Status assessment, nor must the recovery result in a change to the conservation status. (Note: Recoveries limited to captive breeding in zoos or cultivation in botanical gardens, while the wild population remains stable or is declining, may be included in this list, but the fact that the recovery was limited to captive breeding or cultivation should be mentioned. A local recovery may be included if it is a noteworthy local recovery, in which case an IUCN global categorization as "Vulnerable" is not required. The recovery does not need to be recent. The word "recovering" in the title of the article does not mean a listed species is currently recovering at any specific point in time. If a recovery is later reversed, even if the species becomes extinct, the recovery may be included in this list, but the reversal should be mentioned.)

== Recovering species ==
=== Birds ===
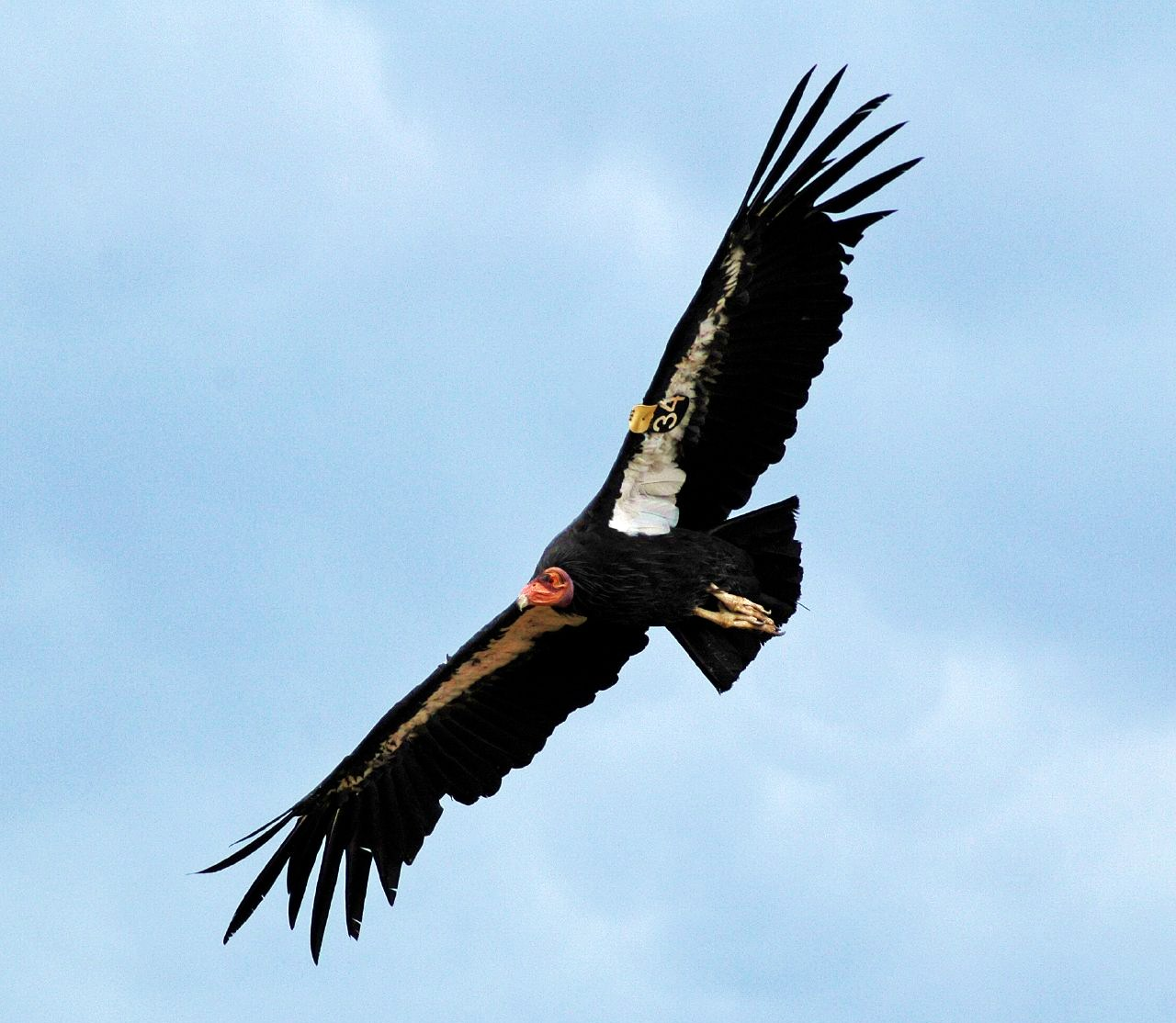
California condor (Gymnogyps californianus)

- Bald eagle (Haliaeetus leucocephalus) – The population declined severely in the early 1900s, leading the US to list it as Endangered in 1978. By 2020, the population had recovered to over 200,000 individuals.
- Brown pelican (Pelecanus occidentalis) – The number of individuals in the US, particularly in Southern California and along the Gulf Coast, dropped severely in the early 1900s. It recovered dramatically after DDT was banned in the US.
- California condor (Gymnogyps californianus) – Only 22 individuals were alive in 1982. Captive breeding increased the population to over 500 in 2024, including 93 mature individuals in the wild.
- Chatham Island black robin (Petroica traversi) – This species recovered from a low of five birds in 1980, including only one breeding female, to about 300 in 2021.
- Echo parakeet (Alexandrinus eques) (formerly Psittacula eques) – Assessed by IUCN in 1994 as Critically Endangered, the status improved to Vulnerable in 2019. The population increased from fewer than 20 individuals in 1992 to 750 in 2017.
- Greater prairie-chicken (Tympanuchus cupido) – Originally widespread through the Great Plains of North America, this species was no longer found in many parts of the original range as of 2020. Conservation status was assessed as Vulnerable in 2007, but improved to Near Threatened in 2020. Population increased by about 7% per year from 2007 to 2017, resulting in an estimated 360,000 mature individuals in 2017.
- Kākāpō (Strigops habroptilus) – Indigenous to New Zealand, the population declined to 49 birds in 2000. Intensive management increased the population to 116 in 2018.

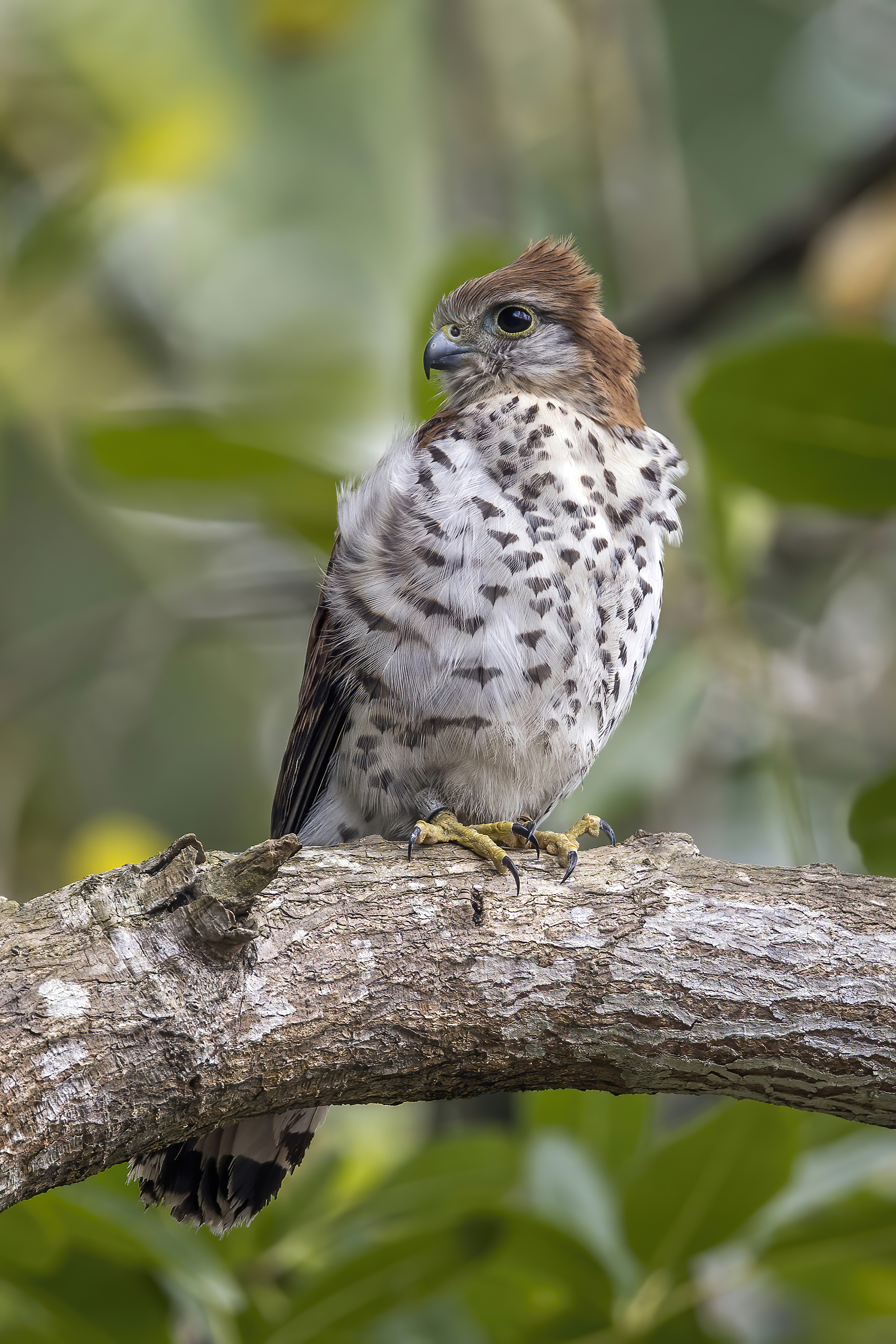
Mauritius kestrel (Falco punctatus)

- Mauritius kestrel (Falco punctatus) – Only four known individuals remained in 1974. Intensive management increased the population to about 800 in 2006, but it subsequently declined to around 140 in 2021.
- Nene (Branta sandvicensis) – The population of this species, also known as the Hawaiian goose, benefited from a 1958 law that created a protection program. The program caused the numbers to increase from fewer than 50 individuals to over 1,700 in 2021.
- Peregrine falcon (Falco peregrinus) – This species approached local extinction in some regions of North America in the early 20th century (partially because of DDT). This species was categorized as Endangered by the US government in 1970. It largely recovered after pesticide bans and reintroductions, and was removed from the Endangered list in 1999. In 2021, it was categorized as Least Concern globally.
- Ridgway's hawk (Buteo ridgwayi) – The population of this species, endemic to the island of Hispaniola, reached a low of about 208 mature individuals in 2000, but efforts from The Peregrine Fund caused numbers to increase to about 322 in 2024. In spite of the increase, the IUCN conservation status remained at Critically Endangered in 2024 – the same level it had been since 2000 – because the species was subjected to a variety of pressures that threatened its recovery.
- White-tailed eagle (Haliaeetus albicilla) – This bird species was almost locally extinct in western Europe around 1900. Reintroduction and other conservation measures in Norway, the British Isles, and elsewhere led to a partial recovery in those regions. The global population was over 20,000 in 2021.
- Whooping crane (Grus americana) – The number of individuals fell to under 100 in the mid-20th century. The number of mature individuals in 2020 was estimated to be between 50 and 249, increasing to over 500 in 2025.

=== Mammals ===
- American bison (Bison bison) – This species decreased from tens of millions to only a few hundred in the late 1800s. Conservation increased the total population to over 500,000 in 2008, although most lived in herds managed for slaughter or hunting rather than for conservation. The number in free-ranging or semi-free-ranging herds was over 11,000 in 2016.

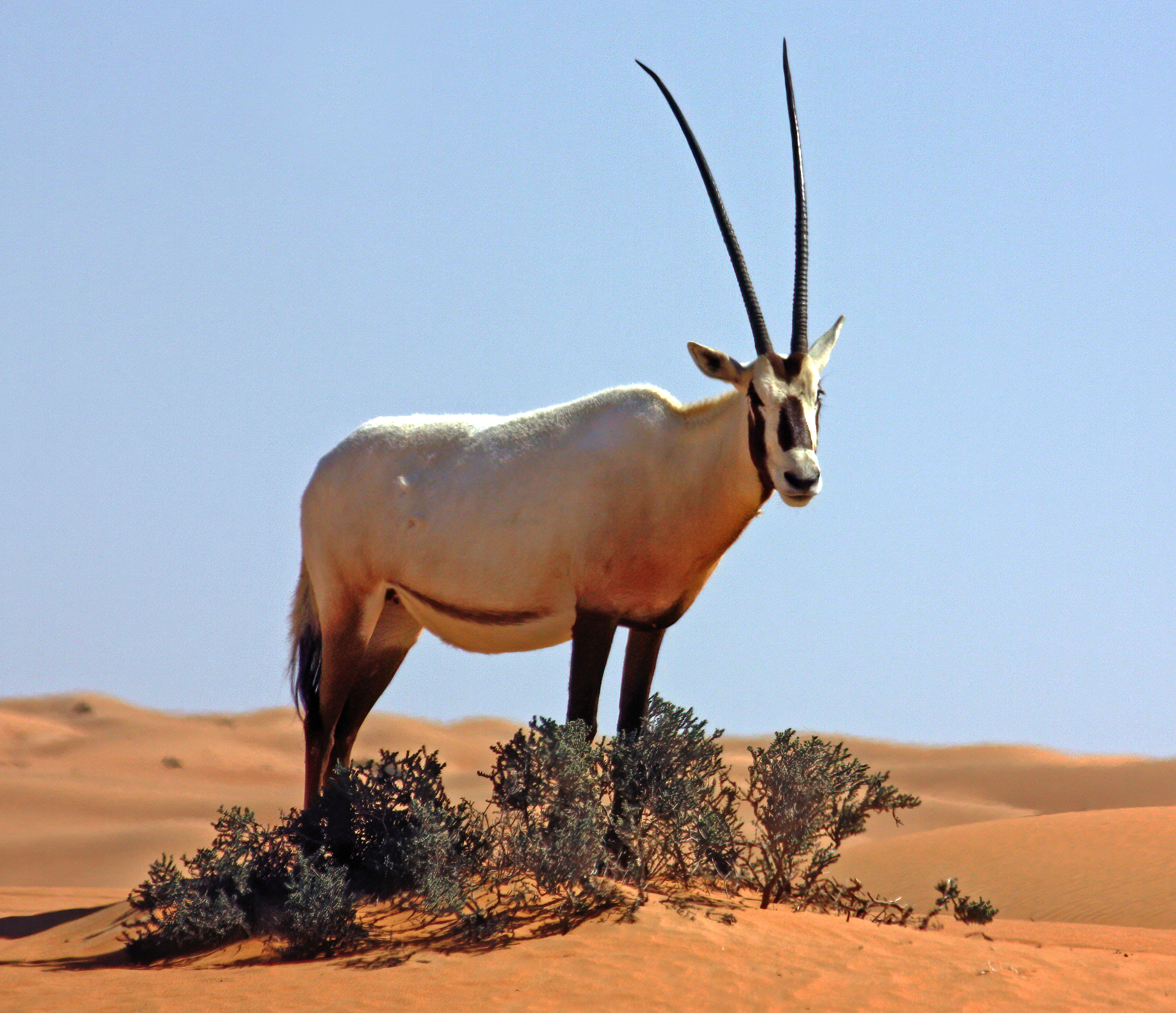
Arabian oryx (Oryx leucoryx)

- Arabian oryx (Oryx leucoryx) – Extinct in the wild by 1972, this species was reintroduced in the 1980s. By 2011, over 800 individuals lived in managed wild populations, although poaching remained a severe problem. The population was declining in 2017.
- Black-footed ferret (Mustela nigripes) – This species was thought extinct until a population of 18 was found in 1981. Breeding and reintroduction in the US during the period from 1991 to 2009 established multiple wild populations. Population declined from 2008 to 2015, with about 295 mature individuals in 2015. The species remains locally extinct in Canada and Mexico.
- Black rhinoceros (Diceros bicornis) – Hunting and poaching reduced the numbers of this species to about 100,000 in 1960, and then to 2,354 in the mid-1990s. IUCN set the conservation status to Endangered in 1986 and further degraded it to Critically Endangered in 1996. Subsequent conservation efforts increased the number of mature individuals in the wild to an estimated 3,142 in 2024.
- Channel Island fox (Urocyon littoralis) – Some island populations fell below 20 individuals in the 1990s before recovering rapidly through conservation, reaching over 4,000 individuals in 2011.
- European beaver (Castor fiber) – This species was nearly exterminated across Europe around 1900, when the population reached a low of 1,200. Reintroduction to many river systems produced a rebound to 639,000 in 2006. The North American beaver (Castor canadensis) was introduced into Finland and northwest Russia in the 1930s to replace the locally extinct European beaver and has established a stable population there.

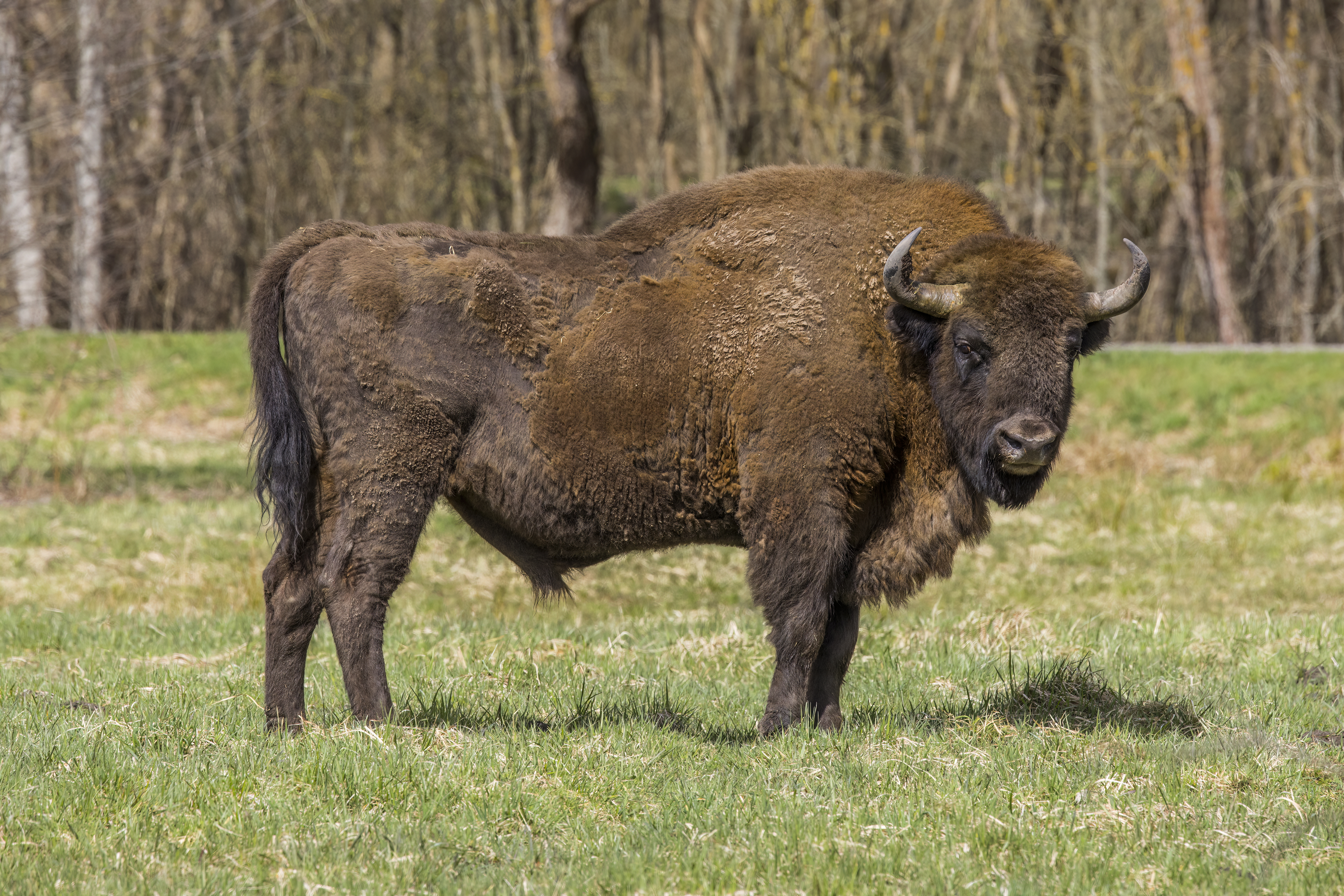
European bison (Bison bonasus)

- European bison (Bison bonasus) – Extinct in the wild after World War I, this species was later reintroduced from captive animals. Several thousand individuals lived in Europe in 2020.
- Giant panda (Ailuropoda melanoleuca) – Listed as Endangered by IUCN in 1990, the status of this species improved to Vulnerable in 2016 after decades of habitat conservation.
- Golden lion tamarin (Leontopithecus rosalia) – Fewer than 200 individuals of this tamarin remained in the wild in the 1970s. The population recovered to over 3,000 in 2018 due to captive breeding and habitat restoration, but was declining in 2019.
- Grey wolf (Canis lupus) – The conservation status of this species was assessed as Vulnerable in 1982, as it had been locally extinct in much of North America and Western Europe by the mid-20th century. The status improved to Least Concern in 2004 after conservation efforts led to partial recovery in some of those regions.
- Iberian lynx (Lynx pardinus) – This species recovered from the brink of extinction in 2000, reaching an estimated 1,668 individuals in 2022.
- Eastern gorilla (Gorilla beringei) – The conservation status of the mountain gorilla subspecies (Gorilla beringei beringei) was Critically Endangered in 1996, but the population increased to over 1,000 in 2018 due to anti-poaching efforts and habitat conservation.

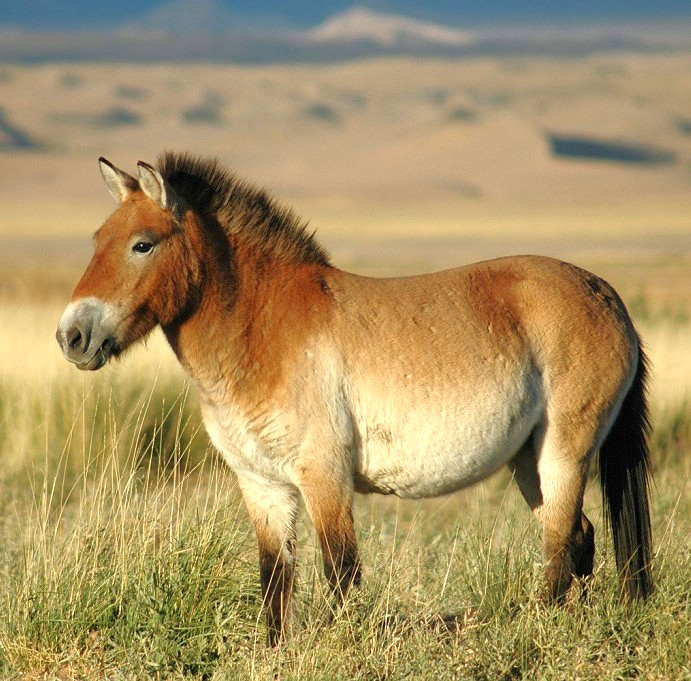
Przewalski's horse (Equus przewalskii)

- Przewalski's horse (Equus przewalskii) – This species was extinct in the wild by the 1960s, but captive populations in zoos enabled the reintroduction to Mongolia and China. As of 2014, there were 1,988 total individuals, of which 387 (178 mature) were in the wild.
- Saiga antelope (Saiga tatarica) – The population was originally in the millions, but was reduced to about 1,000 in the early 20th century due to hunting. After protections in Russia were implemented in 1919, the population increased to over one million, but fell again after removal of hunting restrictions (in the 1950s) and the breakup of the USSR (1991). The population dropped to a low of about 26,000 in 2000. Renewed conservation measures led to a population of about one million mature individuals in 2023.
- Scimitar-horned oryx (Oryx dammah) – In the Holocene, the estimated population of this oryx was about one million, but hunting and poaching reduced the count to under one thousand in the 1980s. The species was declared Extinct in the Wild by IUCN in 2000. Reintroduction into the wild began in 2016. Although the number of mature individuals in the wild was only about 150 in 2022, there were 15,000 living ex situ.
- Southern white rhinoceros (Ceratotherium simum simum) – This subspecies of white rhinoceros was on the brink of extinction around 1900, with fewer than 50 individuals surviving. Assessed as Vulnerable in 1994, its status improved to Near Threatened in 2002, and the wild population (of all ages) was over 20,000 in 2012. The population declined by 15% from 2012 to 2017 due to poaching for export to Southeast Asia. An estimated 10,080 mature individuals were left in the wild in 2017.
- Vicuña (Vicugna vicugna) – The population was likely over one million in the pre-Columbian era, but declined to 10,000 individuals by the mid-20th century. Assessed as Vulnerable in 1982, its status improved to Least Concern in 2008, with an estimated population of 350,000 mature individuals.

==== Marine mammals ====
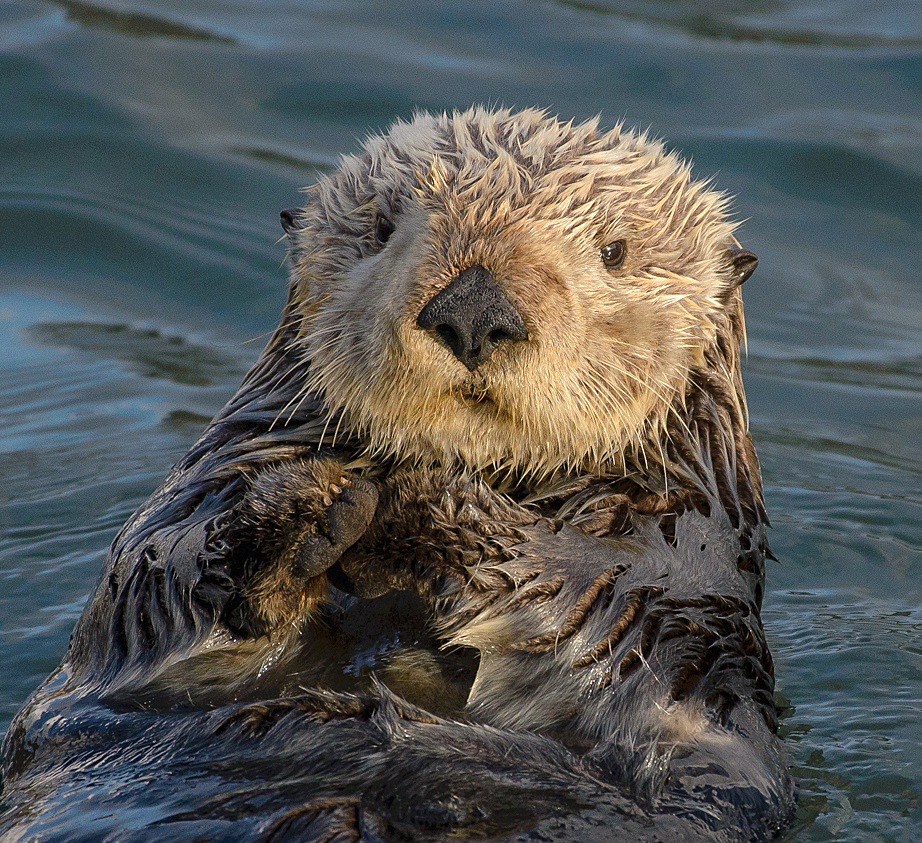
Sea otter (Enhydra lutris)

- Blue whale (Balaenoptera musculus) – The population was severely depleted during the era of modern whaling from the 1860s to about 1970. The global population was estimated at 140,000 in 1926. First listed as Endangered by IUCN in 1986, the population was assessed as increasing in 2018, with an estimated 5,000 to 15,000 mature individuals. Populations around Antarctica and near Chile were above carrying capacity in 2014, although the global status remained Endangered as of 2018.
- Gray whale (Eschrichtius robustus) – This species became extinct in the Atlantic Ocean due to whaling. The Pacific population was severely depleted in the early 20th century, but the population in the eastern Pacific increased in the latter half of the 20th century.
- Hawaiian monk seal (Neomonachus schauinslandi) – After 50 years of population decline, this species was identified as Critically Endangered in 2008. Thereafter, gains were seen (reaching 1,605 individuals in 2022) and the status improved to Vulnerable in 2025.
- Humpback whale (Megaptera novaeangliae) – The commercial whaling industry over-hunted this species in the 20th century, leading to severe depletion. Many populations rebounded after a global whaling moratorium, leading to an estimated 84,000 mature individuals (total 135,000) in 2018.
- Northern elephant seal (Mirounga angustirostris) – This species was nearly hunted to extinction in the mid-1800s, with only about 100 known survivors in 1890. As of 2010, there were over 200,000 individuals.
- Sea otter (Enhydra lutris) – Hunting caused the population of this species to decrease to about 2,000 in 1911. The otters recovered to 125,000 in 1997. In 2021, the population was declining and the IUCN status remained Endangered.

=== Reptiles ===
Blue iguana (Cyclura lewisi)

- American alligator (Alligator mississippiensis) – The population of this species fell in the early 20th century due to hunting and habitat loss, leading the US government to classify it as Endangered in the 1960s. Recovery has been successful, with over 750,000 mature individuals in 2019.
- American crocodile (Crocodylus acutus) – The population declined through much of the 20th century due to hunting for skins, as well as habitat loss and other factors. It recovered in many parts of its range after the 1970s, including Cuba, US (Florida), Mexico, and Costa Rica. However, recovery has been limited on the Pacific coast of South America (Colombia and Ecuador). The number of mature adults in the wild was estimated at 5,000 in 2020.
- Blue iguana (Cyclura lewisi) – This species was assessed by the IUCN as Critically Endangered in 1996, but improved to Endangered in 2012. The population in the wild was about 250 in the 1940s and fell to 25 in 2002. A captive breeding program increased the population of mature individuals to 443 in 2012, with good prospects for continued increase.

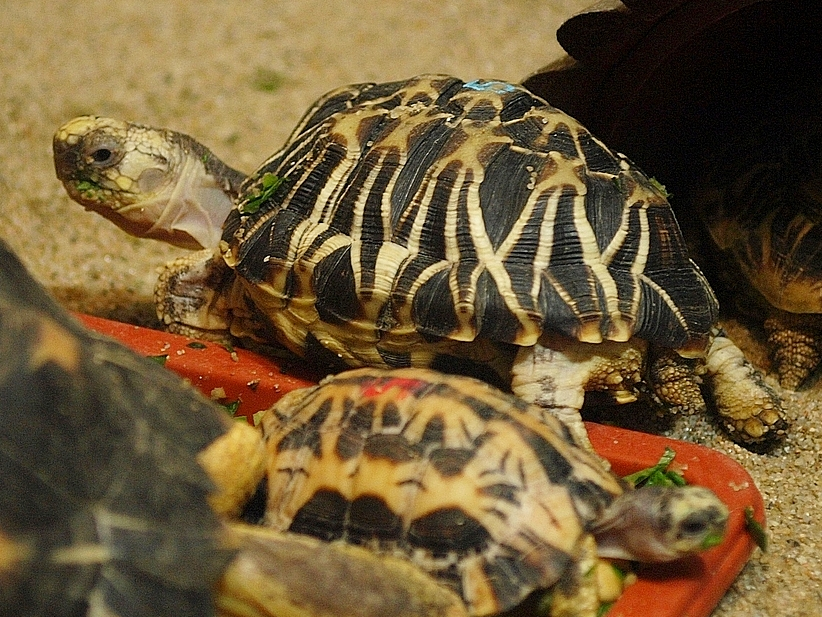
Burmese star tortoise (Geochelone platynota)

- Burmese star tortoise (Geochelone platynota) – This species was considered extinct in the wild in its native habitat in Myanmar around 2000. Its former habitat had been flooded due to dam construction. Reintroduction into new habitats began in 2013, and in 2023 scientists concluded that the wild population was increasing. However, the population counts were uncertain and – as of 2024 – the IUCN conservation status remains Critically Endangered.
- Galapagos giant tortoise (Chelonoidis niger) – This species once numbered over 250,000 in the Galapagos Islands, but hunting caused three subspecies to become extinct. Total population dropped to 3,060 individuals in 1974, but rebounded to 19,000 in 2009. (Note: In particular, the recovery of Hood Island giant tortoise subspecies was successful.) As of 2020, most subspecies remain Critically Endangered.
- Gharial (Gavialis gangeticus) – This species became locally extinct in many of the river systems where it lived in South Asia, leading to its designation as Endangered in 1982. Conservation measures, including ex situ breeding and reintroductions to rivers were implemented starting in the 1970s. Continued habitat degradation led the IUCN to downgrade the conservation status to Critically Endangered in 2007, but subsequent efforts increased the number of mature individuals in the wild to between 300 and 900 in 2025.

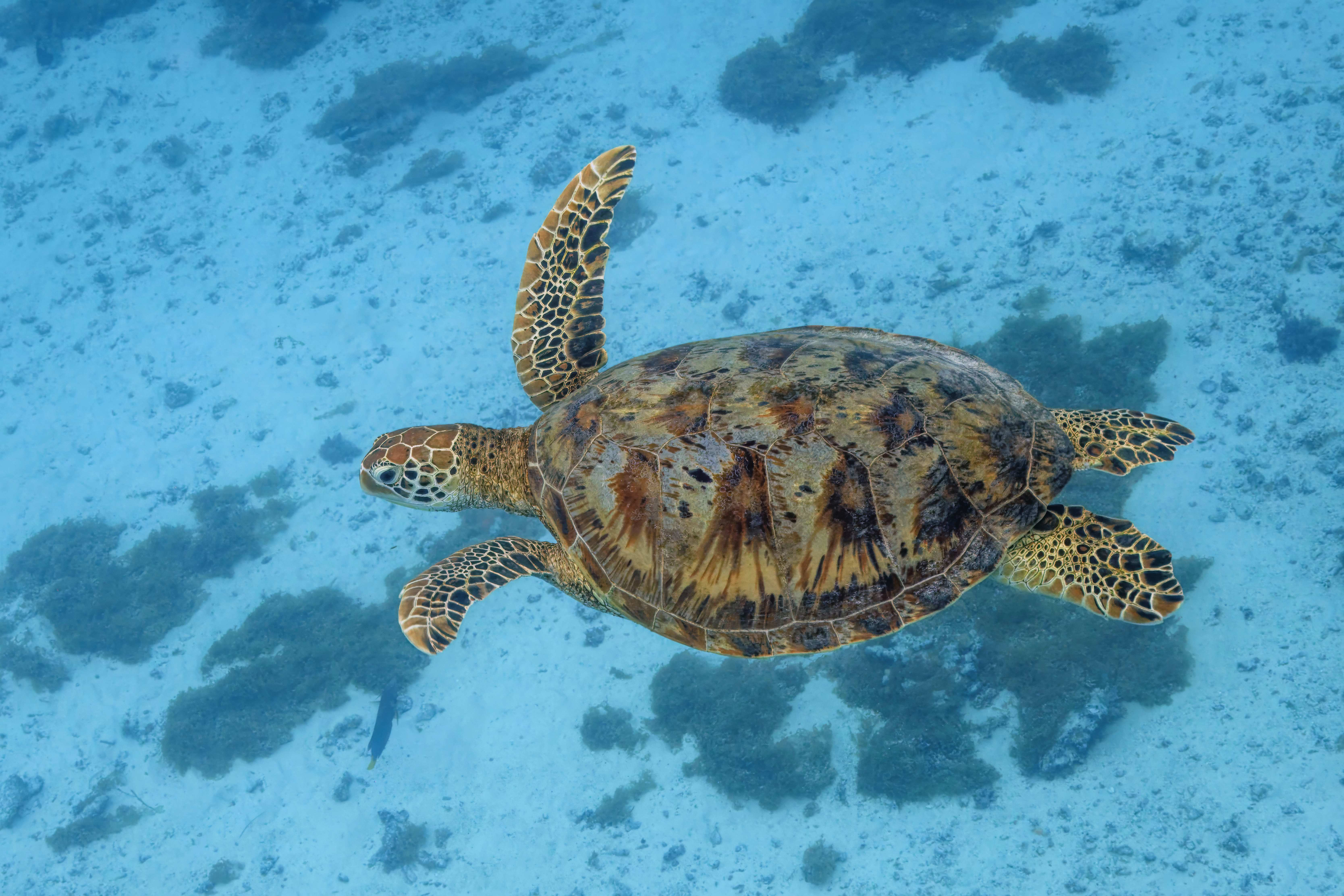
Green sea turtle (Chelonia mydas)

- Green sea turtle (Chelonia mydas) – Conservation status of this species was classified by the IUCN as Endangered in 1982, but a population increase of about 28% from the 1970s to 2024 led the IUCN to upgrade the classification to Least Concern in 2025.
- Jamaican iguana (Cyclura collei) – Thought to be extinct in the mid-1940s, an individual of this species was found alive in 1970 in Hellshire Hills, Jamaica. Conservation efforts include ex situ breeding and biannual reintroduction. Classified as Critically Endangered in 1996, the population slowly increased to over 500 mature individuals in the wild in 2021, although habitat loss was still a severe problem at the time, and the population growth was reliant on replenishment from ex situ breeding sites.
- Kemp's ridley sea turtle (Lepidochelys kempii) – The population of this species reached its lowest level around 1985. Conservation measures produced an irregular recovery after that, resulting in a 2016 population of about 9% of 1947 levels. The IUCN status in 2019 was Critically Endangered.

Telfair's skink (Leiolopisma telfairii)

- Round Island boa (Casarea dussumieri) – This species became locally extinct in most of its range, until it remained only on Round Island, where it was found to be near extinction in the 1970s. Conservation status was set to Endangered by IUCN in 1986. A few dozen individuals were reintroduced to a small islet, Gunner's Quoin, where it had resided before, in 2012 and 2014. Status improved to Vulnerable in 2018, with over 1,800 mature individuals.
- Round Island day gecko (Phelsuma guentheri) – This species became locally extinct in most of its endemic range in Mauritius due to the introduction of cats and rats. The population dropped to between 150 and 300 in 1968. As of 2018, it was found only on two small offshore islets. A conservation campaign removed two invasive animals from Round Island: goats in 1979 and rabbits in 1986. The population of mature individuals then increased to about 2,347 in 2018.
- Telfair's skink (Leiolopisma telfairii) – This species became locally extinct in most of its range, until it remained only on Round Island, with a population estimated at between 4,000 and 5,000 in 1975. Goats and rabbits were removed from Round Island and nearby islets as part of a conservation campaign, and the population of mature individuals increased to an estimated 56,202 around 2020. Habitat restoration efforts around 2020 were expected to increase the island's carrying capacity.

=== Fish ===
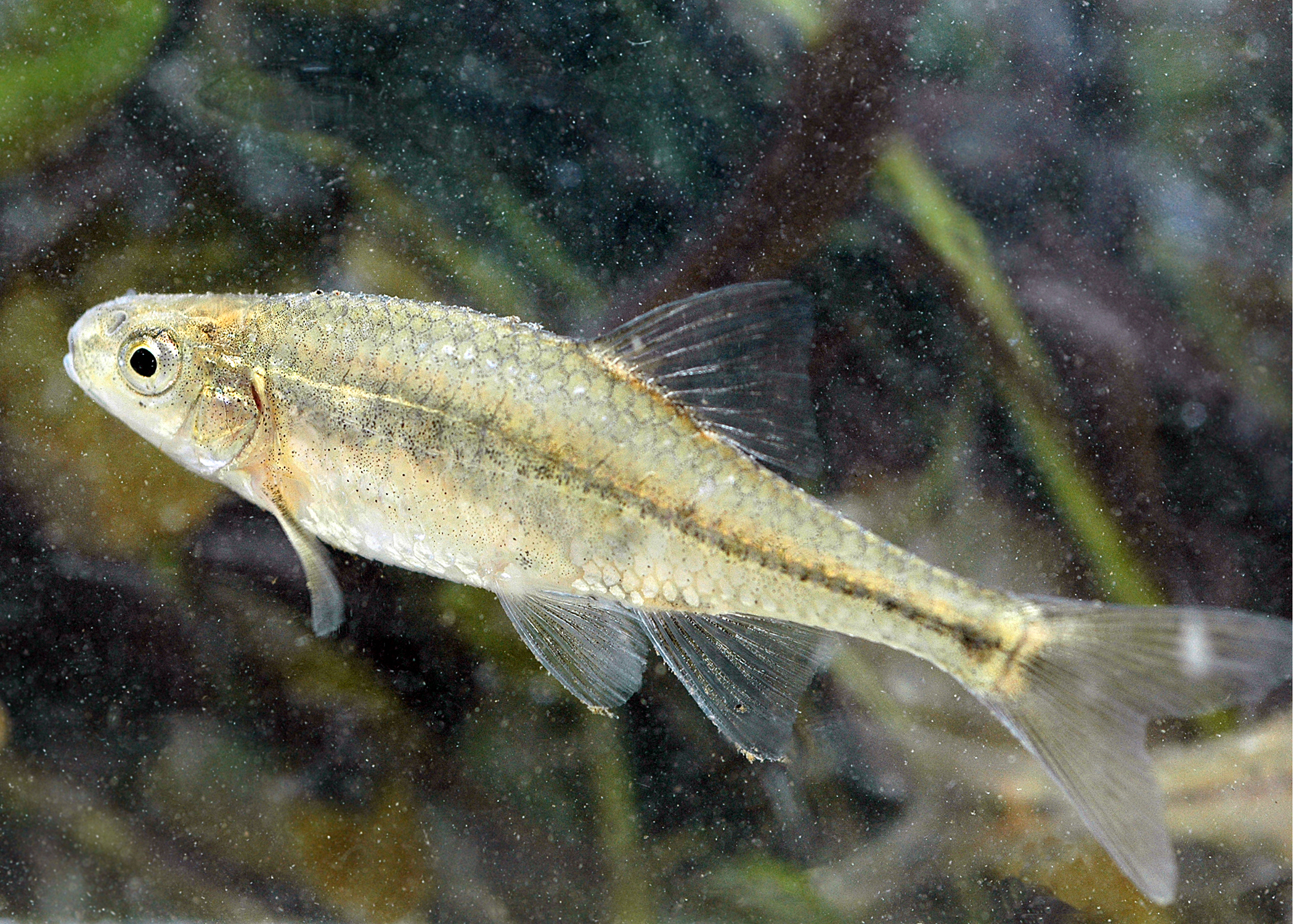
Oregon chub (Oregonichthys crameri)

- Adriatic sturgeon (Acipenser naccarii) – Nearly extinct in the late 20th century due to the damming of rivers, this species was preserved through breeding in fish farms starting in 1988. The Po river in Italy was repopulated with fish from the fish farms starting in 2004. The Po had 50 to 100 individuals as of 2019, but the species was still locally extinct elsewhere in its original range in the Adriatic Sea.
- Oregon chub (Oregonichthys crameri) – Categorized by IUCN as Vulnerable in 1990, the status of this species improved to Least Concern in 2012 because the total population was increasing, and 16 of the 38 populations had a stable or increasing population trend. Total population was estimated at 140,000 in 2015.

=== Amphibians ===
- Mallorcan midwife toad (Alytes muletensis) – This species was a living fossil – known only from fossil records – until it was discovered alive in 1977. A captive breeding program was initiated in the 1980s, with reintroductions to the wild starting in 1989. Recovery thereafter was slow and irregular. Between 1,000 and 3,000 mature individuals were in the wild as of 2023.

=== Mollusks ===
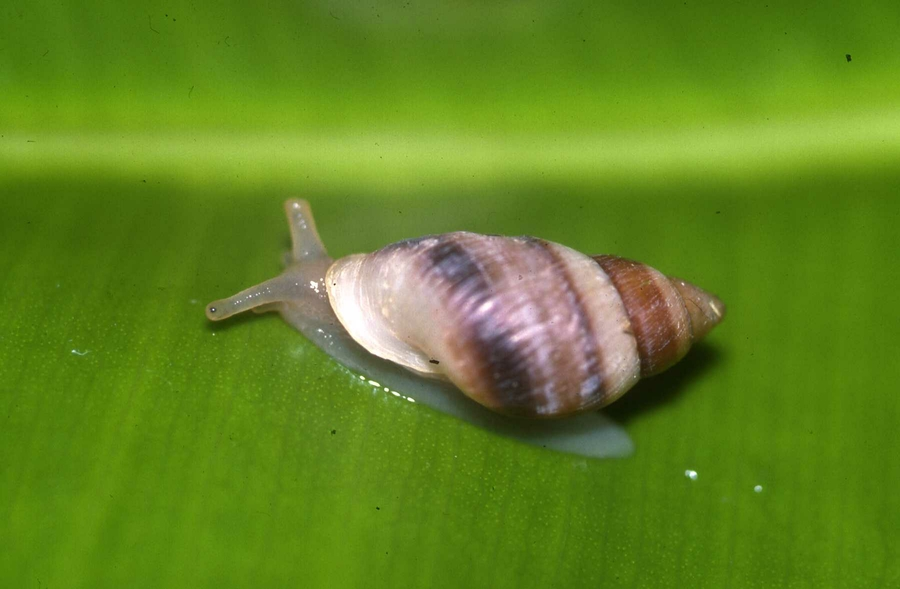
Partula taeniata is one species in the genus Partula, commonly called Polynesian tree snails.

- Polynesian tree snails, genus Partula – Many species in this genus of Polynesian snails were driven to extinction or near extinction by introduced predatory snails. Biologists worldwide preserved captive populations in the early 21st century, including the species Partula taeniata. Several populations were re-established in the wild between 2016 and 2025.
- Pink mucket (Lampsilis abrupta) – Populations of this freshwater mussel were decreasing in 2012, but an active breeding program introduced new populations into two rivers around 2020.

=== Arthropods ===
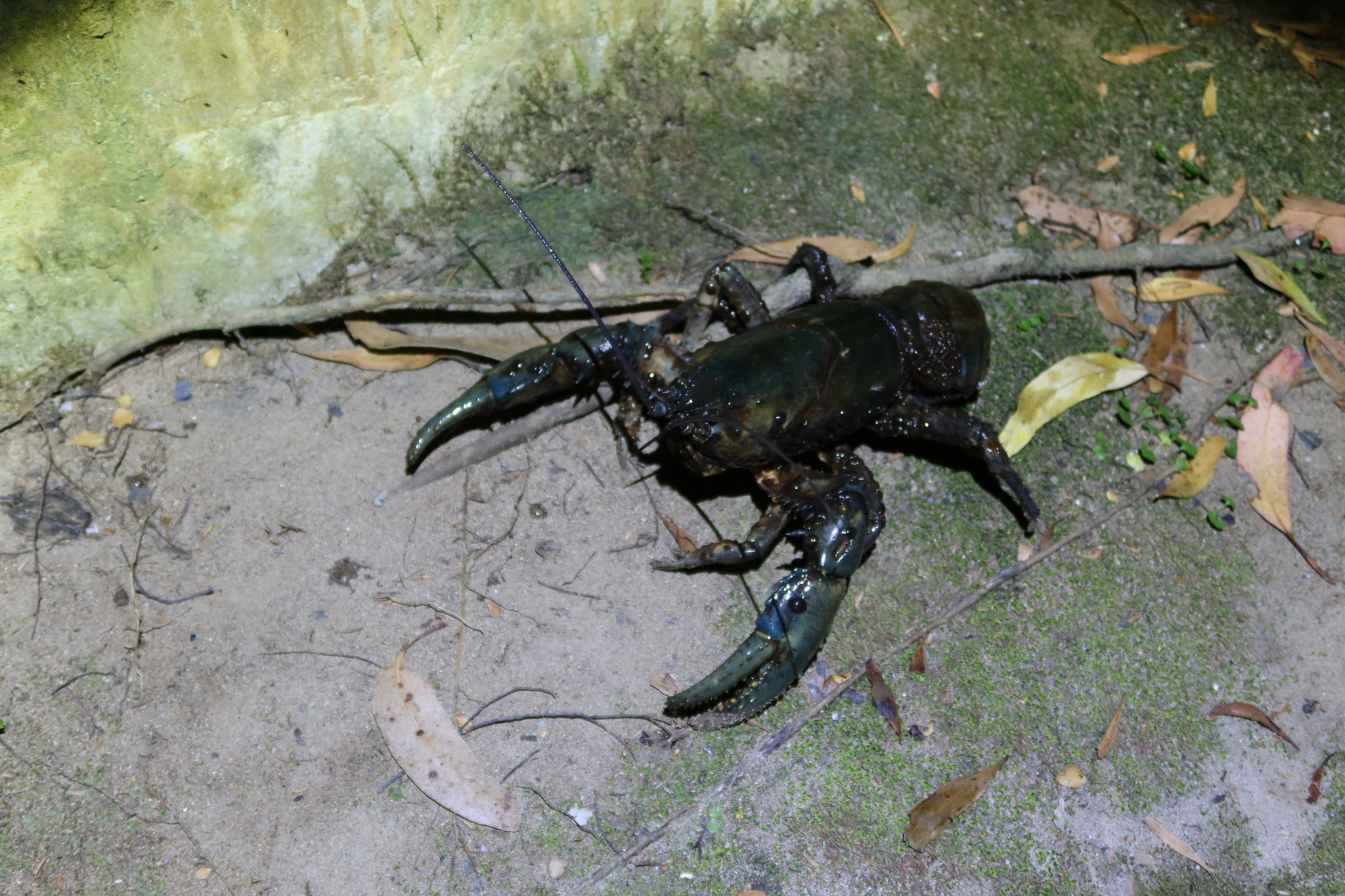
Tasmanian giant freshwater crayfish (Astacopsis gouldi)

- Desertas giant wolf spider (Hogna ingens) – When assessed by the IUCN in 2014, this species was found to be nearly extinct in the only place it is endemic: Deserta Grande Island. As of 2024, it was being successfully bred in captivity while preparations for reintroduction were underway.
- Lord Howe Island stick insect (Dryococelus australis) – Thought to be extinct for about 80 years after invasive rats devastated its island home, this species was rediscovered in 2001 on a tiny offshore sea stack (rock outcropping). Fewer than 30 individuals were found at that time. Captive breeding produced thousands of individuals and – as of 2024 – reintroduction is planned after rat eradication is confirmed.

==== Butterflies and moths ====
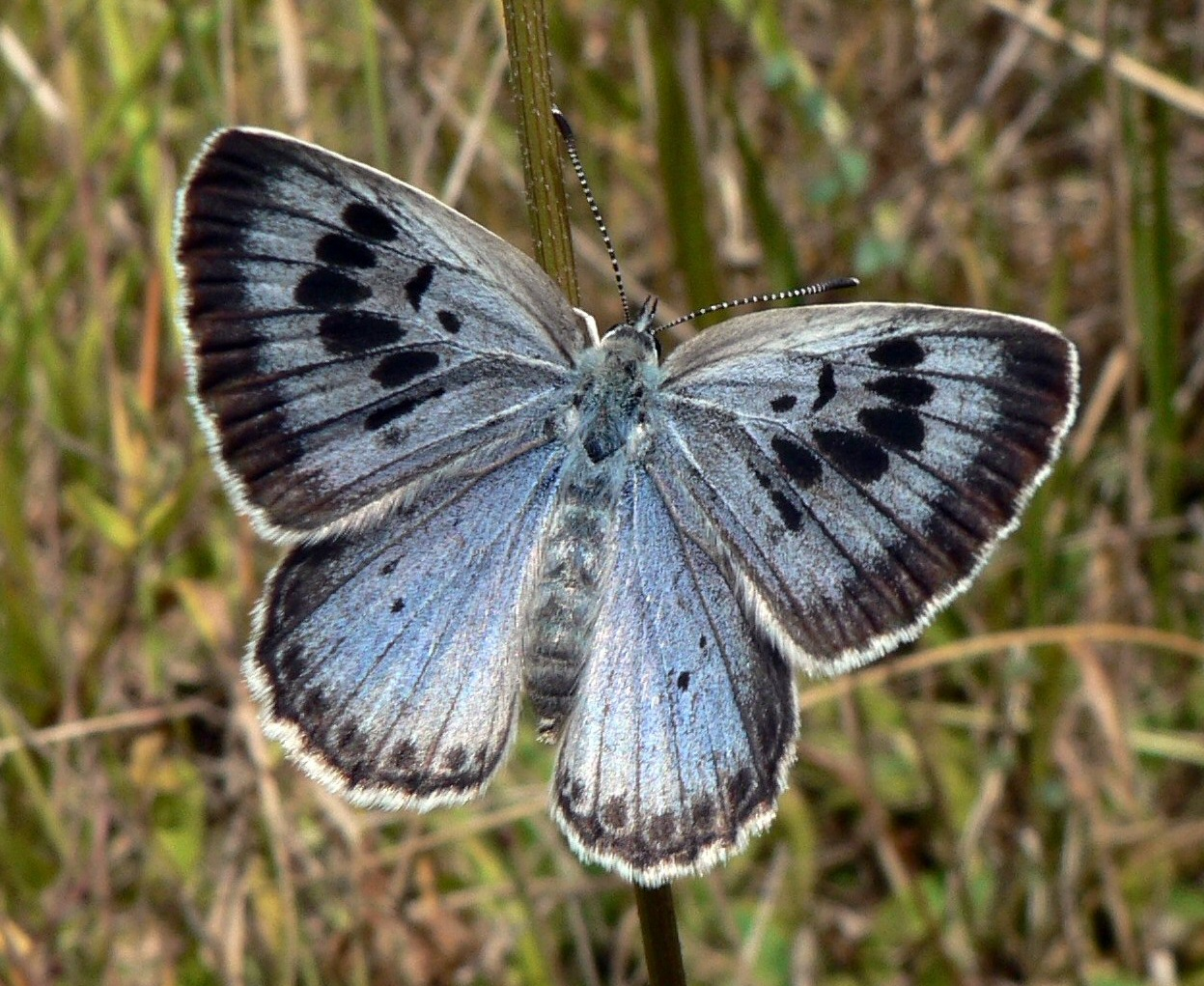
Large blue butterfly (Phengaris arion)

- Large blue butterfly (Phengaris arion) (Note: Not to be confused with Phengaris arionides) – This species became locally extinct in the Netherlands and the United Kingdom in the 1970s. Scientists discovered that it depended on a specific ant species for its caterpillars to survive. After restoring the necessary grassland habitat and reintroducing butterflies from Sweden, by 2009 it had been re-established in areas where it had been locally extinct.

=== Plants ===
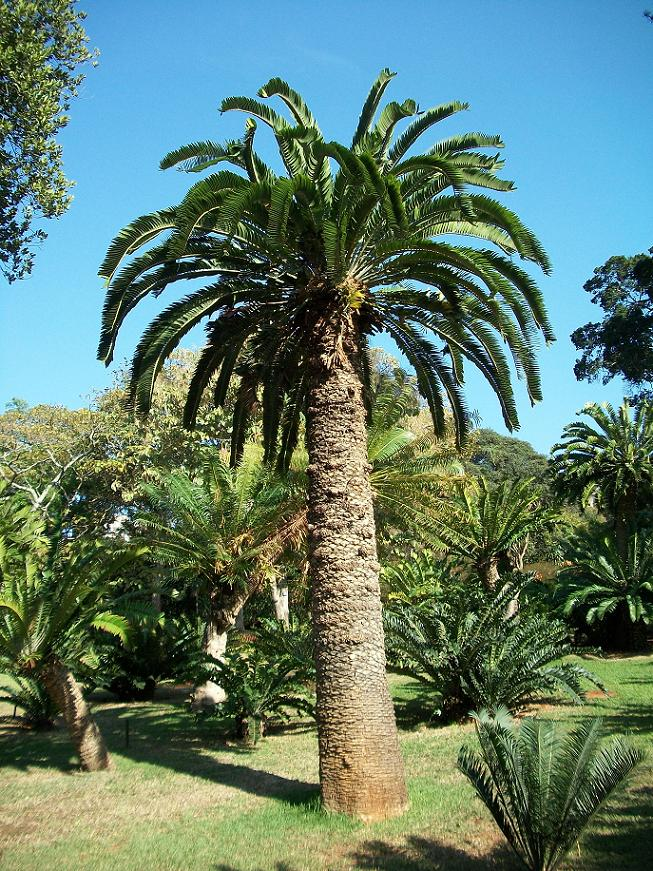
Wood's cycad (Encephalartos woodii)

- Franklin tree (Franklinia alatamaha) – Extinct in the wild since the early 1800s, this species survived into the 21st century because it was cultivated from seeds collected before its disappearance. A 1998 survey located 2,000 cultivated specimens growing worldwide in 8 countries and 36 US states, primarily in botanical gardens.
- Wollemi pine (Wollemia nobilis) – A critically endangered species, there were fewer than 100 individuals at its only wild location when it was discovered in Australia in 1994. A successful ex situ cultivation program resulted in the tree being grown in over 30 countries, and reduced the risk of extinction. Forest fires in 2020 reduced the wild population to between 39 and 56 mature individuals.
- Wood's cycad (Encephalartos woodii) – Only four individuals of this cycad existed when it was discovered in 1895 in a small cluster in a South African forest. All were clones sharing the same origin. Samples were collected in the early 1900s for propagation, but it was extinct in the wild by 1916. Propagation led to several hundred individuals being cultivated around the world as of 2022.

== See also ==
- Conservation biology – A scientific discipline that studies the conservation of nature
- Endangered species recovery plan – A plan aimed at helping a species recover from endangered or threatened status
- Lists of IUCN Red List endangered species – A process for recording species that are endangered or threatened
- Rare species – An informal term for species that are uncommon
