= Jardin de l'État =

Historic botanical garden on the island of Réunion

Coordinates: 20°53′12″S 55°27′04″E

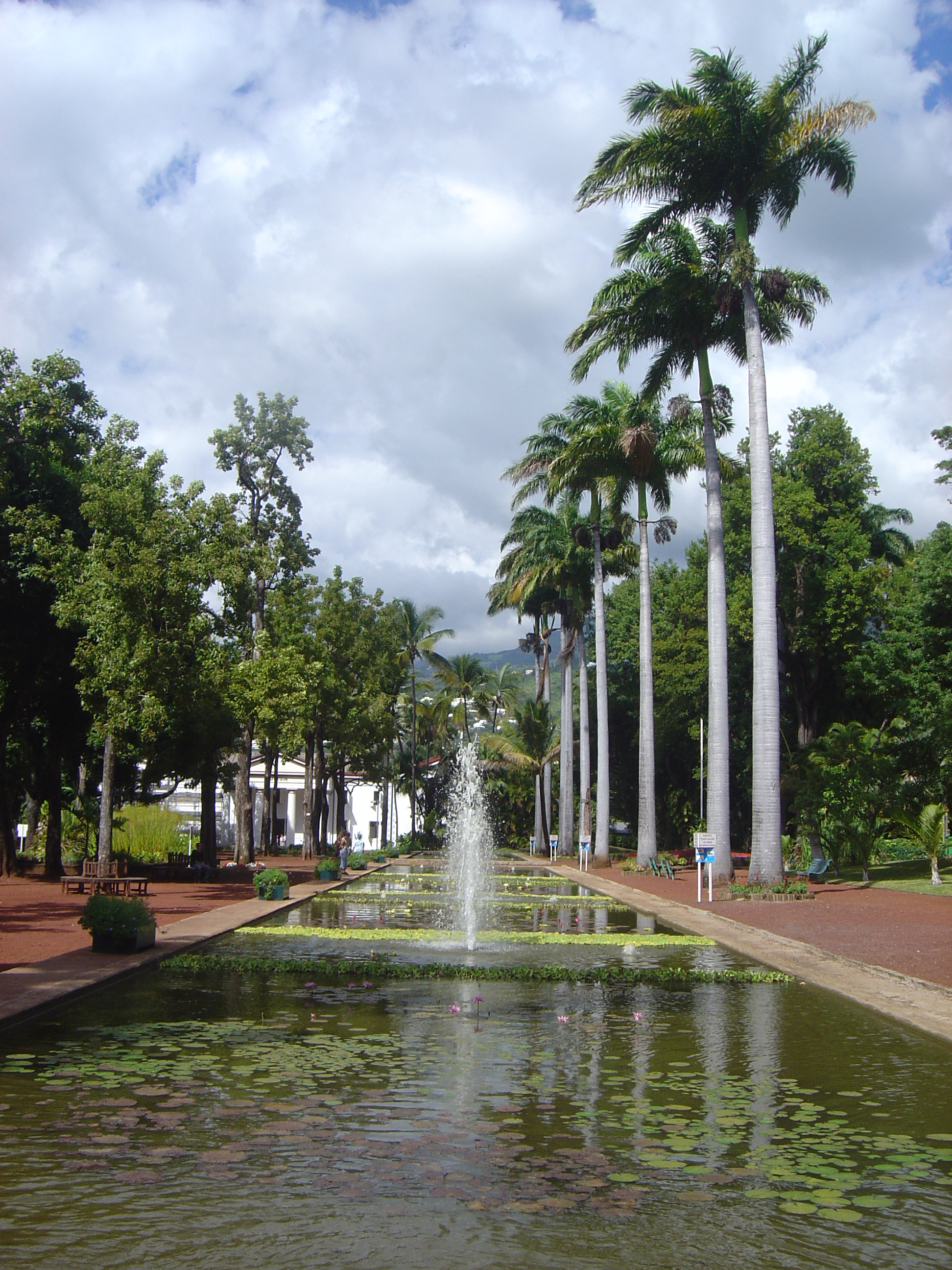
Waterway in the Jardin de l'État.

The Jardin de l'État, formerly known as the Jardin du Roy, is a historic botanical garden on the island of Réunion, found in the capital Saint-Denis.

Planted with trees and spices taken from outside the island by Pierre Poivre, the garden is home to a natural history museum opened in August 1855. The garden was built from 1767 to 1773.

The garden's golden era came at the beginning of the 19th century, when its plants were tended to by famous botanists such as Joseph Hubert, Nicolas Bréon and Jean-Michel-Claude Richard. At that time the garden housed 2000 species. 7000 of its plants were distributed to the islanders in 1825 as part of a scheme to improve the colonial agriculture.

Today, the garden's main entrance faces the historic Rue de Paris. In the garden itself a bust of Pierre Poivre and a Wallace fountain.

== History ==
The Jardin de l'État was classified as a monument historique by the French Government on December 29, 1978.

== Trees ==
The garden is home to around fifty species of tree, including:

- Adansonia digitata - African baobab
- Adenanthera pavonina - Barbados pride
- Araucaria columnaris - Cook pine
- Artocarpus heterophyllus - Jackfruit
- Averrhoa carambola - Carambola
- Bambusa glaucescens - Golden goddess bamboo
- Barringtonia asiatica - Sea poison tree
- Caryota mitis - Fishtail palm
- Chrysophyllum cainito - Cainito
- Cocos nucifera - Coconut palm
- Cordia amplifolia
- Couroupita guianensis - Cannonball tree
- Crescentia cujete - Calabash tree
- Damara araucaria
- Dictyosperma album - Hurricane palm or Princess palm
- Elaeis guineensis - Oil palm or African oil palm
- Elaeodendron orientale - Olive wood
- Enterolobium cyclocarpum - Elephant ear tree
- Eucalyptus citriodora - Lemon-scented gum
- Ficus microcarpa - Chinese banyan
- Heritiera littoralis - Looking-glass mangrove
- Hymenaea courbaril - Jatobá
- Inga laurina
- Khaya senegalensis - Senegal mahogany
- Kigelia africana - Sausage tree
- Livistona chinensis - Chinese fan palm
- Majidea zanguebarica - Blackpearl
- Mangifera indica - Mango tree
- Melaleuca quinquenervia - Broad-leaved paperbark
- Mimusops coriacea
- Pandanus sanderi - Screw pine
- Pandanus utilis - Common screwpine
- Peltophorum pterocarpum - Yellow poinciana
- Pterocarpus indicus - Angsana
- Ravenala madagascariensis - Travellers palm
- Roystonea oleracea - Trinidad royal palm or Venezuela royal palm
- Samanea saman - Saman or rain tree, monkey pod, cenizaro or cow tamarind
- Senna siamea - Siamese cassia
- Sterculia foetida - Stinky sterculia or Sterculia nut or Java olive
- Syzygium cumini - Jambul or Jamun or Jamblang
- Tabebuia pallida - Cuban pink trumpet tree
- Tamarindus indica - Tamarind
- Terminalia arjuna
- Terminalia catappa - Indian almond, Bengal almond, Singapore almond, Malabar almond, Tropical almond, Sea almond, or Umbrella tree
- Vitex doniana - African black plum
- Yucca guatemalensis - Spineless yucca

And also:

- Carambole marron
- Coing de Chine
- Ficus banian
- Garcinéa
- Palmier bouteille
- Santal
- Zévis de l'Inde

=== Bibliography ===
- Guide du jardin de l'État de Saint-Denis, J. Dequaire, Srepen, July 1984.

== See also ==
- Conservatoire botanique national de Mascarin
- List of botanical gardens in France
