= Asterolecanium coffeae =

star scale

Scientific classification
- Domain: Eukaryota
- Kingdom: Animalia
- Phylum: Arthropoda
- Class: Insecta
- Order: Hemiptera
- Suborder: Sternorrhyncha
- Family: Asterolecaniidae
- Genus: Asterolecanium
- Species: A. coffeae

Binomial name
- Asterolecanium coffeae Newstead, 1911

Species of true bug

Asterolecanium coffeae or yellow fringed scale is a pit scale insect pest on coffee plants, especially Coffea arabica, throughout tropical Africa, including Angola, the Democratic Republic of Congo, Kenya, Uganda and Tanzania. In addition to coffee plants it feeds on jacaranda and Photinia japonica.
