= Jean Michel Claude Richard =

French botanist and plant collector

- Born: 16 August 1787; Volon, Haute-Saône, France
- Died: 28 December 1868 (aged 81); Saint-Denis, La Réunion
- Known for: False claim to have discovered hand-pollination of vanilla
- Scientific career
- Fields: Horticulture, botany
- Workplaces: Jardin du Roy, Île Bourbon (now Réunion)
- Author abbrev. (botany): J.M.C.Rich.

Jean Michel Claude Richard (French pronunciation: [ʒɑ̃ miʃɛl klod ʁiʃaʁ]; 16 August 1787 – 1868) was a French botanist and plant collector active in Senegal, Madagascar, Mauritius, and Réunion, and a Chevalier of the Légion d'honneur.

Richard was born in Volon, Haute-Saône. He was sent to Senegal in 1816 as the colony's gardener-in-chief, but served without obvious distinction until the arrival in 1822 of Baron Jacques-François Roger (1787–1849) who entrusted to Richard the creation of an experimental garden on the left bank of the Sénégal River, near the village of Nghiao, and named it Richard Toll (toll means "garden" in the Wolof language). Richard was responsible for all plants, buildings, and facilities, and under his direction a number of new species were introduced to Senegal, including bananas, manioc, oranges, sugar cane, and coffee. In February 1824 Richard was sent to Cayenne. Directed on 30 July 1824 to keep a diary of his experiences, he developed a catalog of the garden's species, and left Senegal in 1825.

In January 1831 Richard became second director of the Jardin du Roy (now the Jardin de l'État) in the Île Bourbon (now Réunion), succeeding Nicolas Bréon. Under his leadership the garden achieved its golden age. He introduced some 3,000 plant species to the colony, by his reckoning, while studying cryptogams, ferns, and orchids. He also sent lichens from Mauritius to the German specialist Ferdinand Christian Gustav Arnold (1828–1901).

In retrospect, Richard's life has been marred by controversy. In 1841, when the young slave Edmond Albius (1829–1880) discovered the process of hand-pollination of vanilla, Richard claimed to have discovered the technique three or four years earlier. His story created serious doubts about Albius' claims, despite the support for Albius of Féréol Marie Bellier de Beaumont (1759–1831), naturalist Eugène Volcy Focard, and Méziaires of Lepervanche. By the end of the 20th century, Albius was considered the true discoverer.

== Note ==
Other botanists called Richard are:

- Louis-Claude Marie Richard (1754–1821),
- Achille Richard (1794–1852), his son (A.Rich.)
- Olivier Jules Richard (1836–1896) (O.J.Rich.)
- Claude Richard fl.(C.Rich)
- Joseph Herve Pierre Richard (J.H.P.Rich.)

== Selected works ==
- Catalogue du jardin de La Réunion, 1 vol. in 8°, 113 pages, 1856.
