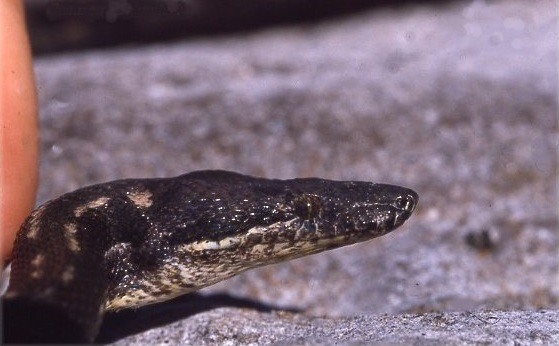
- Round Island ground boa, Casarea dussumieri

Scientific classification
- Kingdom: Animalia
- Phylum: Chordata
- Class: Reptilia
- Order: Squamata
- Suborder: Serpentes
- Superfamily: Bolyerioidea
- Family: Bolyeriidae; Hoffstetter, 1946

Synonyms
- Bolyerinae Hoffstetter, 1946; Bolyeriinae C.J. Goin & O.B. Goin, 1962; Bolyeroidae McDowell, 1987; Bolyeriidae McDowell, 1987

= Bolyeriidae =

Family of snakes

Common names: Mauritius snakes, Round Island boas, splitjaw snakes.

The Bolyeriidae are a family of snakes native to Mauritius and a few islands around it, especially Round Island. They also used to be found on the island of Mauritius, but were extirpated there due to human influence and foraging pigs in particular. These snakes used to be placed in the Boidae, but are now classed as a separate family. Two monotypic genera are recognized, but only a single species is extant (not extinct). Bolyeriidae appear to be most closely related to the Asian genus Xenophidion.

== Geographic range ==
Found in Mauritius and its surrounding islets such as Serpent island, Round island, Flat island etc.

== Genera ==
Genus	Taxon author	Species	Common name	Geographic range
Bolyeria^{T}	Gray, 1842	1	Round Island burrowing boa	Mauritius.
Casarea	Gray, 1842	1	Round Island ground boa	Mauritius.

^{T}) Type genus.

Both of these monotypic genera once inhabited Mauritius and/or a number of islands around it. However, Bolyeria hasn't been reported since 1975 and is believed to be extinct, while Casarea is known to survive only on Round Island.
