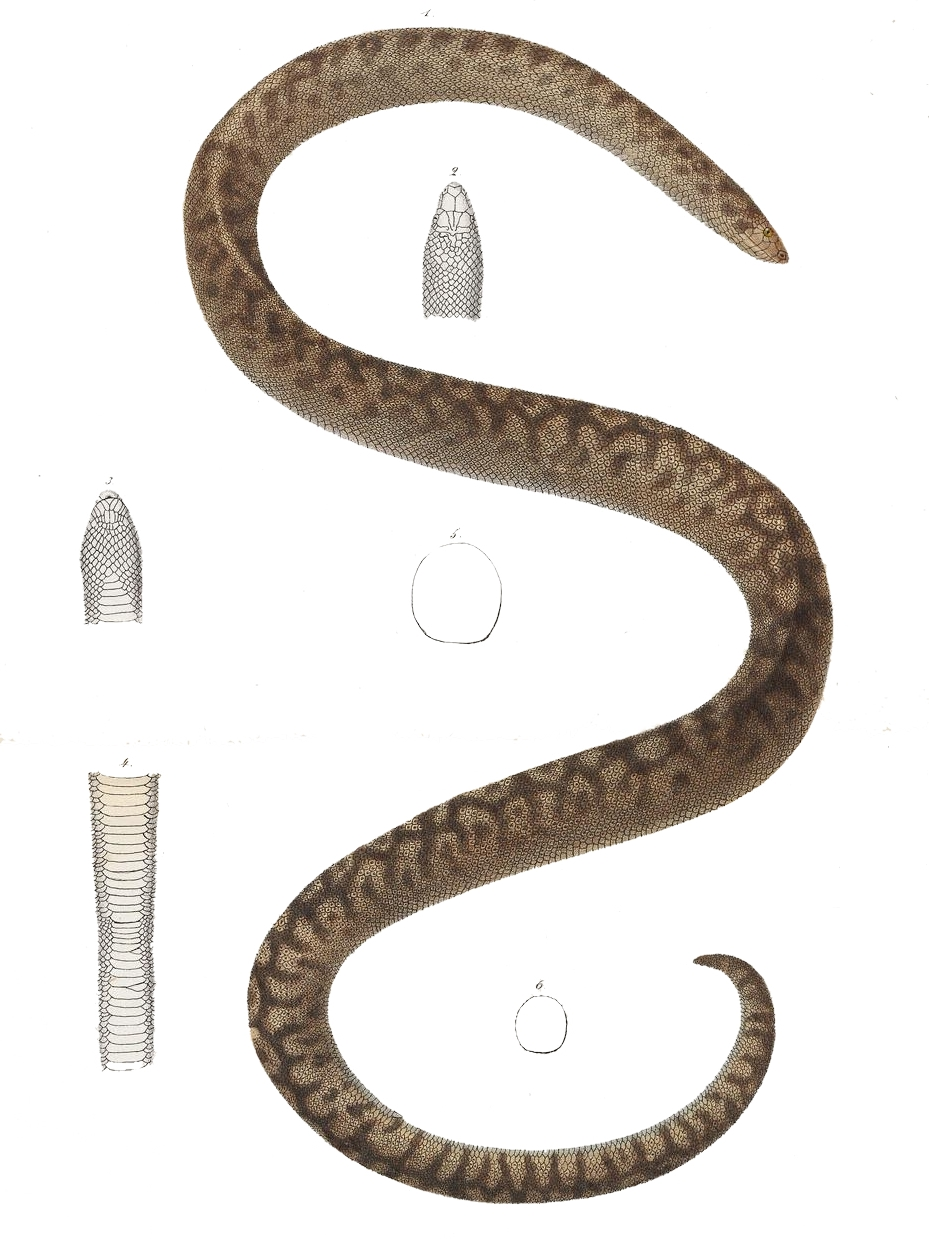

Conservation status
- Extinct (1975) (IUCN 3.1)
- CITES Appendix I

Scientific classification
- Kingdom: Animalia
- Phylum: Chordata
- Class: Reptilia
- Order: Squamata
- Suborder: Serpentes
- Family: Bolyeriidae
- Genus: †Bolyeria; Gray, 1842
- Species: †B. multocarinata

Binomial name
- †Bolyeria multocarinata (F. Boie, 1827)

Synonyms
- Bolyeria Gray, 1842; Uroleptes Fitzinger, 1843; Platygaster A.M.C. Duméril & Bibron, 1844; Bolieria Boulenger, 1893; Eryx Multocarinata F. Boie, 1827; Tortrix Pseudo-Eryx Schlegel, 1837 (typographical error); Bolyeria Pseudo-Eryx — Gray, 1842; Platygaster multicarinatus A.M.C. Duméril & Bibron, 1844; Bolyeria multicarinata — Gray, 1849; Bolieria multicarinata — Boulenger, 1893; Bolyeria multocarinata — Stimson, 1969

= Round Island burrowing boa =

Extinct species of snake

The Round Island burrowing boa (Bolyeria multocarinata) is an extinct species of snake, in the monotypic genus Bolyeria, in the family Bolyeriidae. The species, which was endemic to Mauritius, was last seen on Round Island in 1975. There are no recognized subspecies.

== Description ==
B. multocarinata reached about 1 m (3 ft 3 in) in total length (including tail). Preserved specimens have been reported as having total lengths of 54–140 cm (1.77–4.59 ft). Its colour was described as light brown with blackish spots dorsally, and pink marbled with blackish ventrally. It had a pointed snout with a cylindrical body and head. Its general body form suggests that the Round Island burrowing boa had fossorial tendencies. This species' closest living relative is the Round Island boa (Casarea dussumieri).

== Geographic range ==
The Round Island burrowing boa had an extremely small range of only 1.5 square kilometres (0.58 mi^{2}). Its habitats were hardwood forests and palm savanna. In the past it was found in Mauritius on Gunner's Quoin, Flat Island, Round Island, and Ile de la Passe. It survived the longest on Round Island, where it was last recorded. The type locality given is "Port Jackson" (in error).

== Habitat ==
The preferred natural habitat of B. multocarinata was forest.

== Diet ==
The diet of B. multocarinata is unknown, but it is thought to have eaten lizards and their eggs, as well as the chicks and eggs of ground-nesting and burrowing seabirds.

== Reproduction ==
B. multocarinata was oviparous. Clutch size was about five eggs.

== Conservation status ==
The species Bolyeria multocarinata is classified as Extinct (EX) on the IUCN Red List of threatened species (v2.3, 1994). It was already rare by 1949 and was last seen by conservationists in 1974. Reasons for its extinction are habitat loss caused by soil erosion due to overgrazing by goats and rabbits and heavily persecuted by early settlers.
