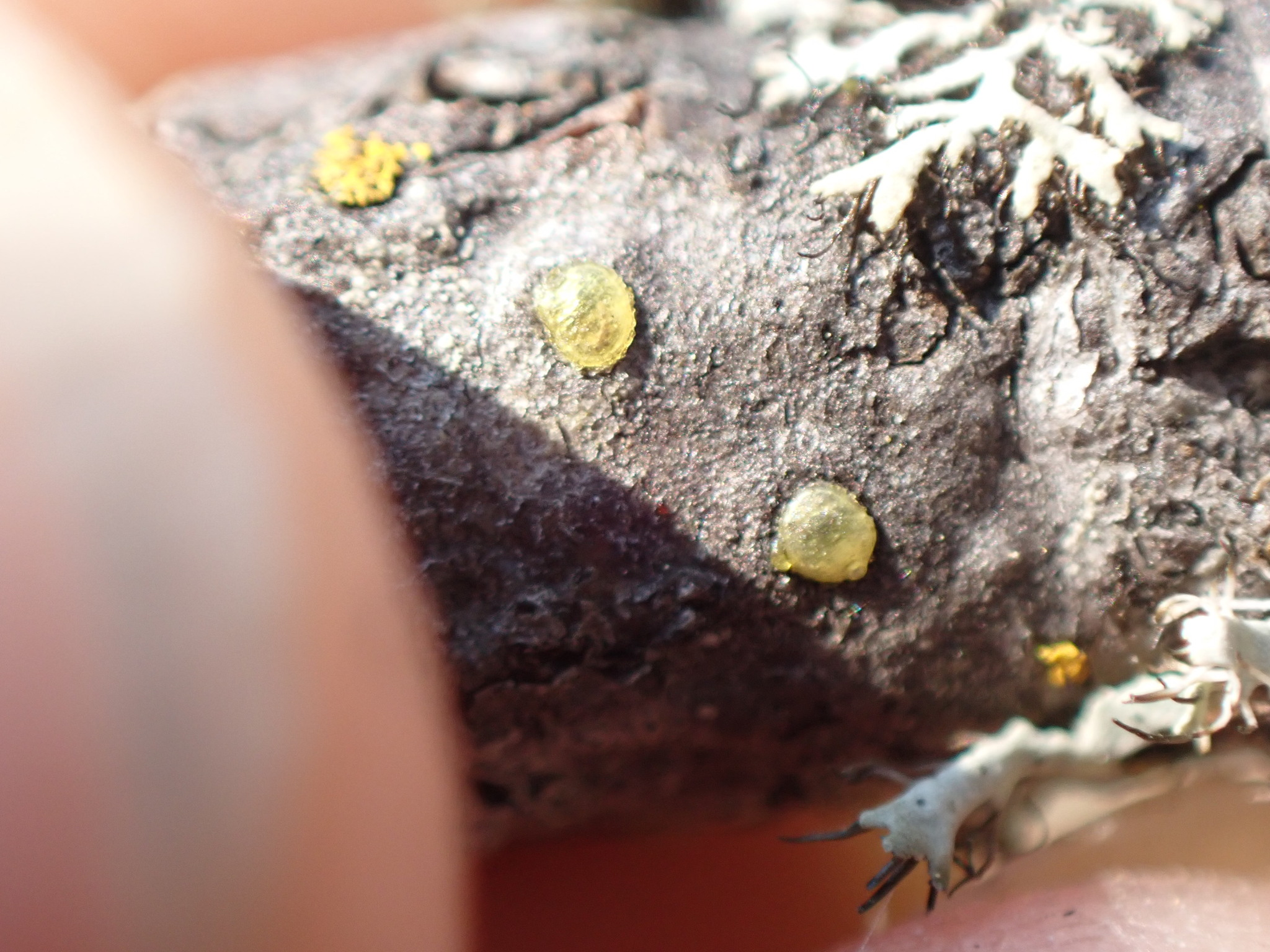
- Asterodiaspis variolosa

Scientific classification
- Kingdom: Animalia
- Phylum: Arthropoda
- Class: Insecta
- Order: Hemiptera
- Suborder: Sternorrhyncha
- Family: Asterolecaniidae
- Genus: Asterodiaspis; Signoret, 1877

= Asterodiaspis =

Genus of true bugs

Asterodiaspis is a genus of true bugs belonging to the family Asterolecaniidae. Species of this genus are found in Europe, North America, and Australia.

== Species ==
The following species are recognised in the genus Asterodiaspis:

- Asterodiaspis bella (Russell, 1941)
- Asterodiaspis ilicicola (Targioni Tozzetti, 1888)
- Asterodiaspis mina Signoret, 1877
- Asterodiaspis quercicola (Bouché, 1851)
- Asterodiaspis repugnans (Russell, 1941)
- Asterodiaspis roboris (Russell, 1941)
- Asterodiaspis suishae (Russell, 1941)
- Asterodiaspis variolosa (Ratzeburg, 1870)
- Asterodiaspis viennae (Russell, 1941)
