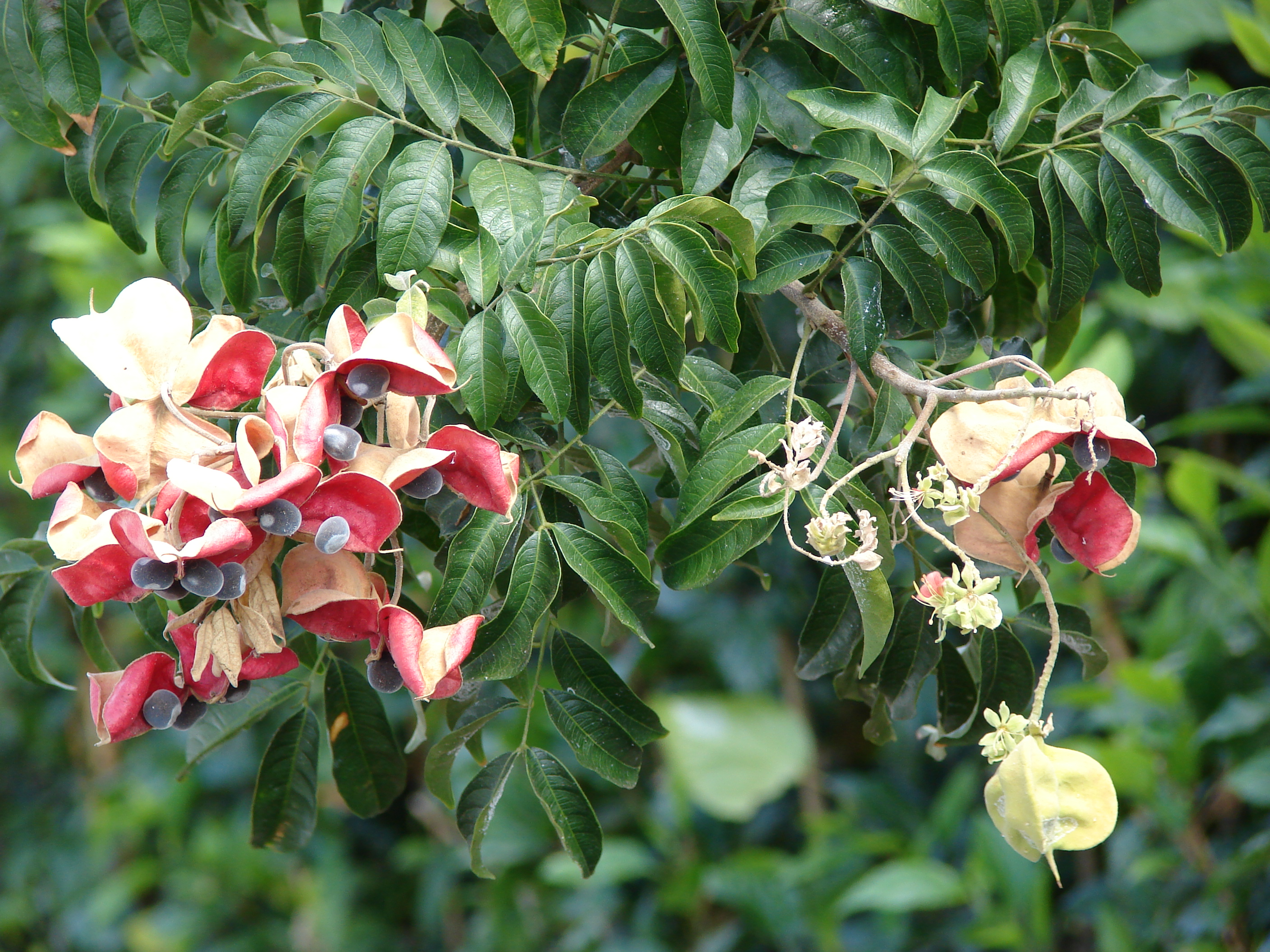
- Majidea zanquebarica

Scientific classification
- Kingdom: Plantae
- Clade: Tracheophytes
- Clade: Angiosperms
- Clade: Eudicots
- Clade: Rosids
- Order: Sapindales
- Family: Sapindaceae
- Subfamily: Dodonaeoideae
- Genus: Majidea; Kirk ex Oliv.

= Majidea =

Genus of flowering plant

Majidea is a genus of flowering plants belonging to the family Sapindaceae.

Its native range is Tropical Africa and Madagascar. It is found in the countries of Angola, Benin, Cameroon, Central African Republic, Congo, Gabon, Ghana, Ivory Coast, Kenya, Liberia, Nigeria, Sudan, Tanzania, Uganda and Zaïre.

The genus name of Majidea is in honour of Majid bin Said of Zanzibar (c. 1834 – 1870), who was the first Sultan of Zanzibar. It was first described and published in Hooker's Icon. Pl. Vol.11 on table 1097 in 1871.

== Known species ==
According to Kew:

- Majidea fosteri (Sprague) Radlk.
- Majidea zanguebarica Kirk ex Oliv.
