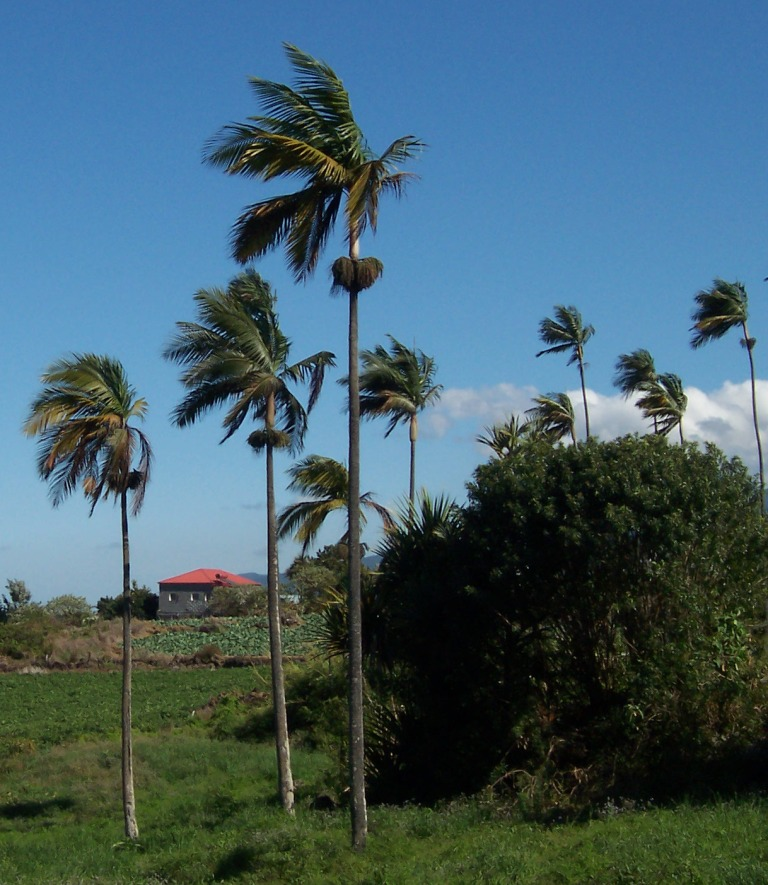
- Cultivated specimens on Réunion

Scientific classification
- Kingdom: Plantae
- Clade: Tracheophytes
- Clade: Angiosperms
- Clade: Monocots
- Clade: Commelinids
- Order: Arecales
- Family: Arecaceae
- Subfamily: Arecoideae
- Tribe: Areceae
- Genus: Dictyosperma; H. Wendl. & Drude
- Species: D. album

Binomial name
- Dictyosperma album (Bory) H. Wendl. & Drude ex-Scheff.

Synonyms
- Areca alba Bory; Linoma alba (Bory) O.F.Cook; Sublimia palmicaulis Comm. ex Mart.; Areca borbonica Kunth; Areca lactea Miq.; Areca propria Miq.; Areca purpurea Linden; Areca furfuracea H.Wendl.; Dictyosperma furfuraceum H.Wendl. & Drude; Areca rubra H.Wendl.; Dictyosperma rubrum H.Wendl. & Drude; Areca pisifera Lodd. ex Hook.f.; Dictyosperma aureum (Balf.f.) G.Nicholson; Areca aurea Van Houtte

= Dictyosperma =

Genus of palms

Dictyosperma is a monotypic genus of flowering plant in the palm family found in the Mascarene Islands in the Indian Ocean (Mauritius, Réunion and Rodrigues). The sole species, Dictyosperma album, is widely cultivated in the tropics but has been farmed to near extinction in its native habitat. It is commonly called princess palm or hurricane palm, the latter owing to its ability to withstand strong winds by easily shedding leaves. It is closely related to, and resembles, palms in the genus Archontophoenix. The genus is named from two Greek words meaning "net" and "seed" and the epithet is Latin for "white", the common color of the crownshaft at the top of the trunk.

== Description ==
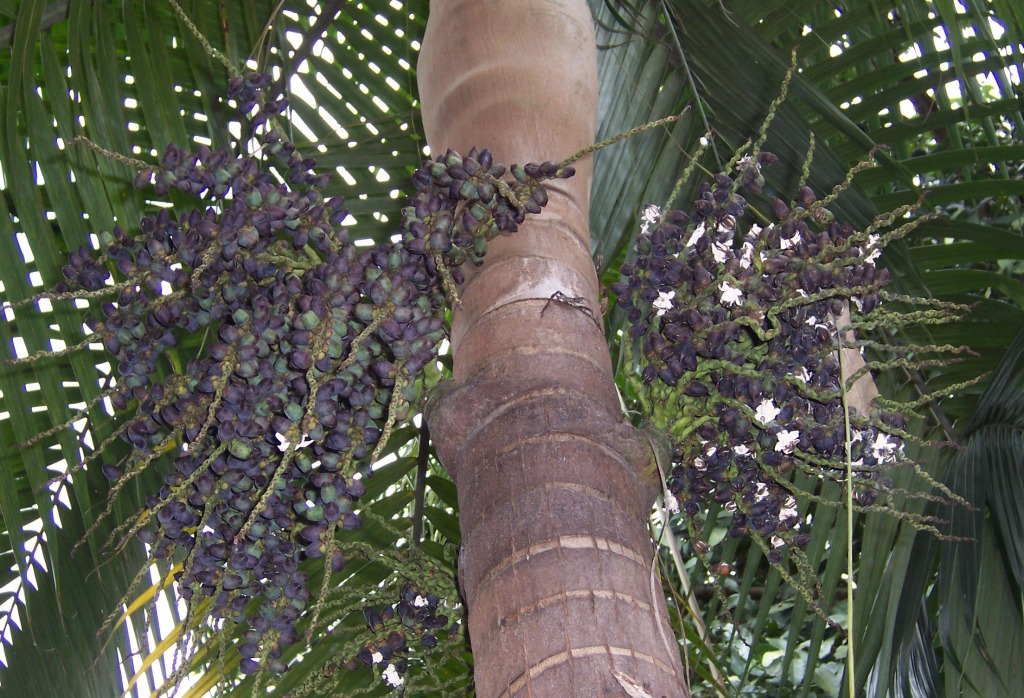
Fruit

The ringed trunks are solitary at 15 cm in diameter with a slight bulge at the base, occasionally reaching up to 12 m in height. The crownshaft is over a meter tall, swollen at the base, and covered in white wax— which has given the palm its epithet album— and small, matted brown hairs, producing a rounded leaf crown 4.5 m wide and 3 m tall. The 2.5 to 3 m leaves are borne on short 30 cm petioles; the arching leaflets are pointed at the apice, from 60 – 90 cm, dark green in color, and emerge from the rachis in a single plane.

On flowering, they produce up to six inflorescences which ring the trunk below the crownshaft, branched to one order, with white to yellow flowers, which are male and female; both pistillate and staminate flowers have three sepals and three petals, the former being smaller than the latter. The ovoid fruit ripen to purple or black in color, containing one brown, ellipsoidal seed.

Three varieties are currently recognized:

- Dictyosperma album var. album (Bory) Scheff. - Mauritius, Réunion
- Dictyosperma album var. aureum Balf.f. in J.G.Baker - Rodrigues Island
- Dictyosperma album var. conjugatum H.E.Moore & J.Guého - 2 remaining specimens on Île Ronde of Mauritius (Characterised by shorter trunk and white leaf-scar)

== Distribution and habitat ==
Living in the coastal forests of the Mascarenes, they experience warm temperatures, high humidity and regular rainfall.

== Asterolecanium dictyospermae ==
Asterolecanium dictyospermae is a species of sap sucking scale insect found only on Île Ronde on the two remaining Dictyosperma album var. conjugatum specimens. It apparently evolved on Île Ronde and became restricted to feeding upon the island's endemic variety, and due to interbreeding (between varieties) on Mauritius itself which jeopardized reproductive potential, the scale insect increased in population as a result of stress upon the host, which then threatens the existence of both host and scale insect.

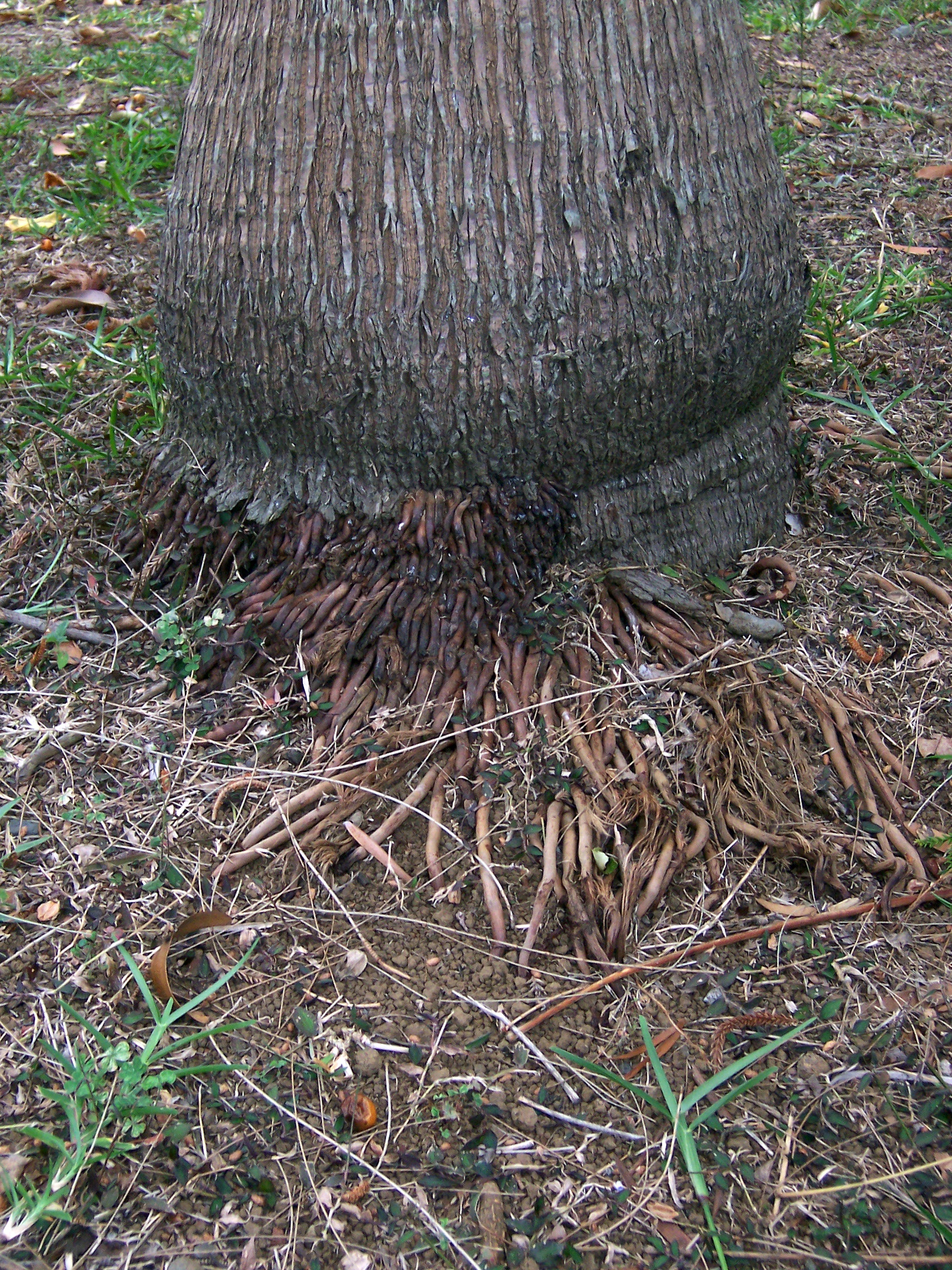
Trunk base and roots

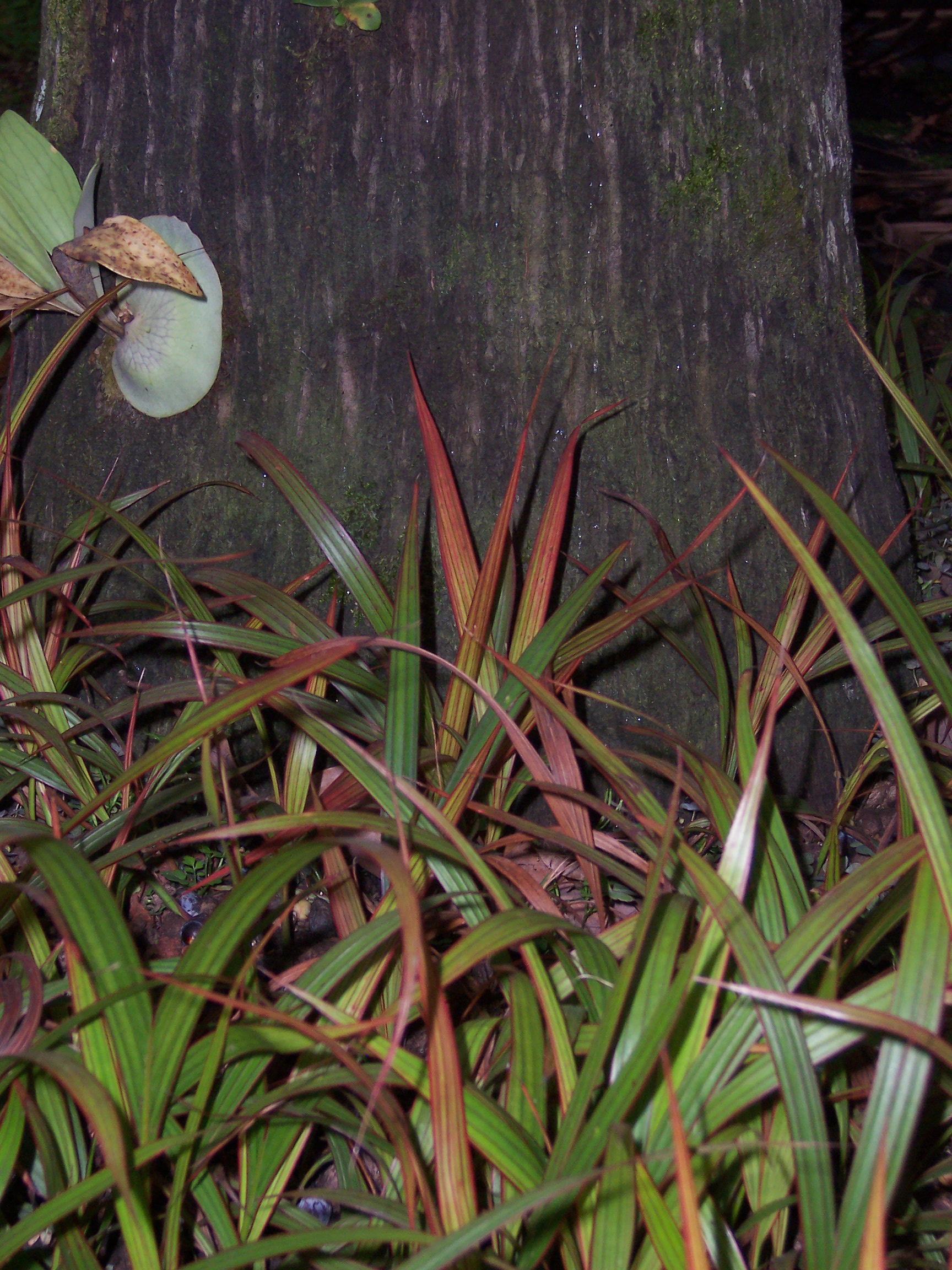
Seedlings with bifid eophyll

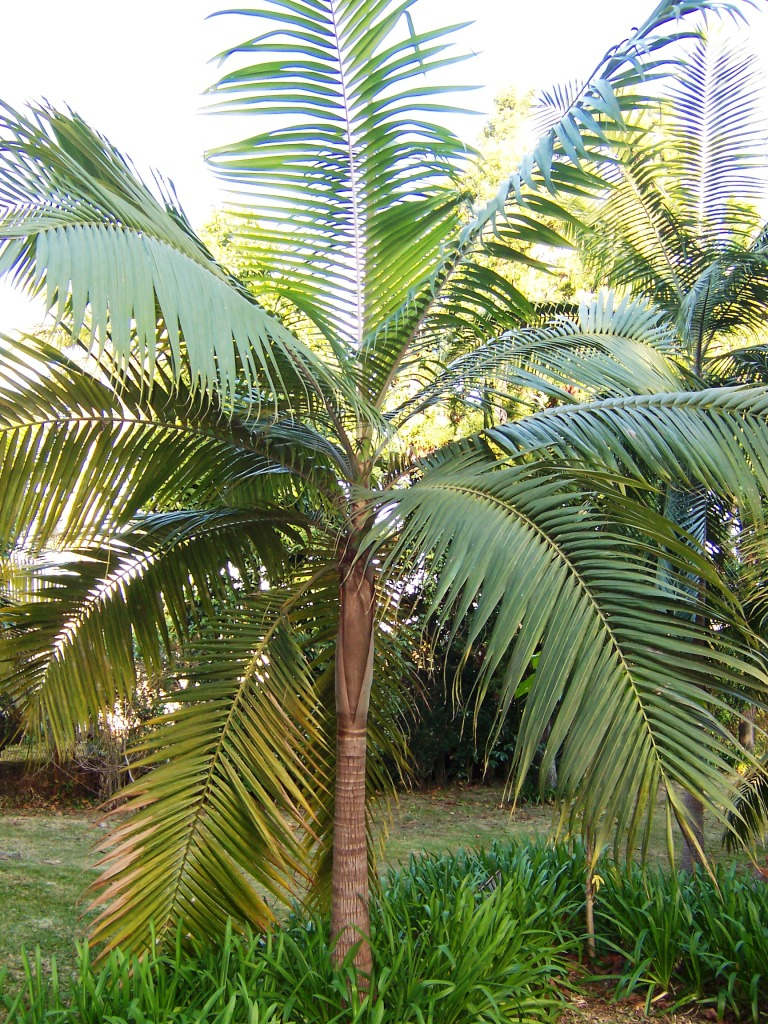
Leaf crown

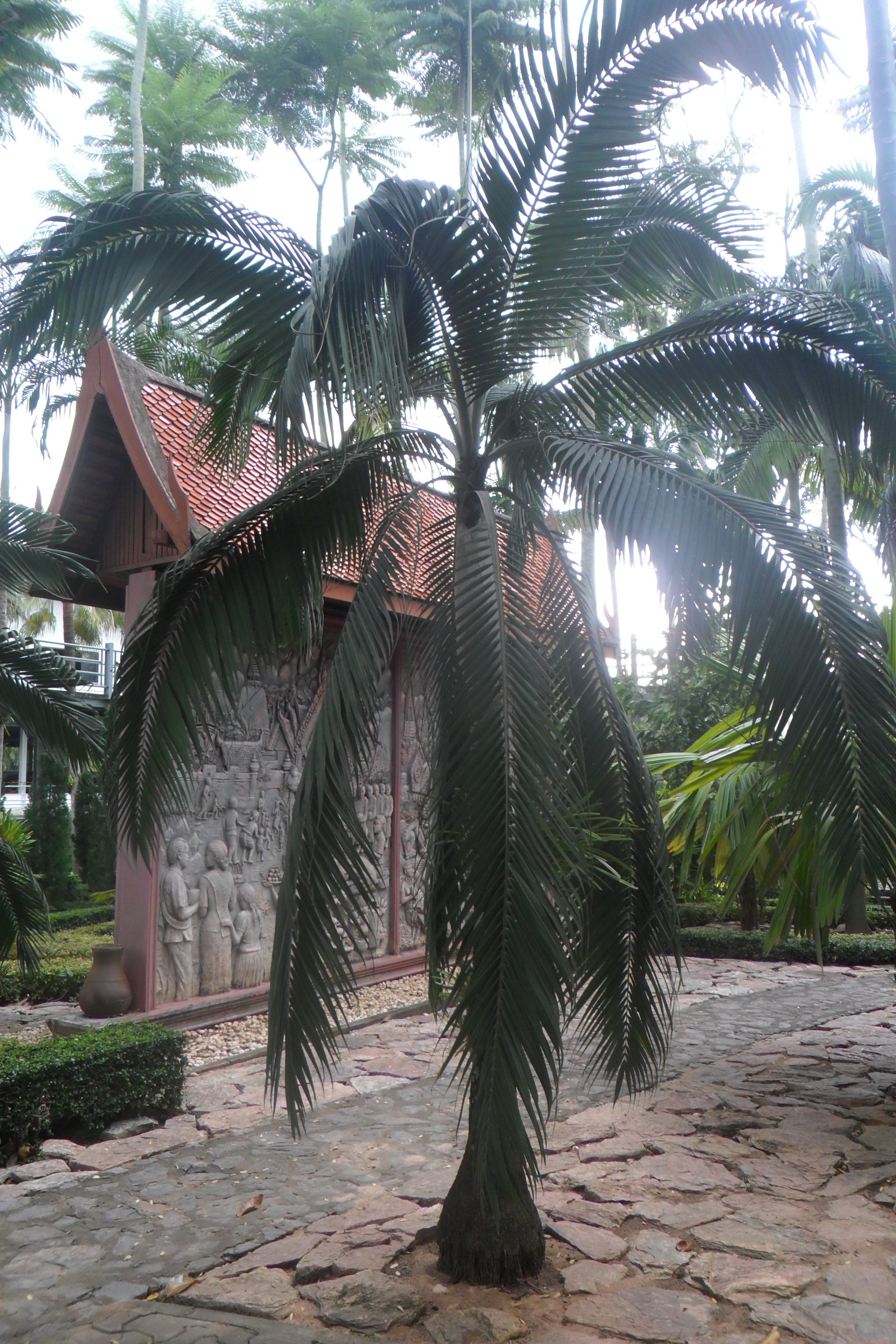
Dictyosperma album var. conjugatum
