= Volon =

- Commune
- Location of Volon
- Location within France Location within Bourgogne-Franche-Comté
- Coordinates: 47°37′27″N 5°43′41″E
- Country: France
- Region: Bourgogne-Franche-Comté
- Department: Haute-Saône
- Arrondissement: Vesoul
- Canton: Dampierre-sur-Salon
- Intercommunality: Quatre Rivières

Government
  - Mayor (2020–2026): Jérôme Favret
- Area^{1}: 5.75 km^{2} (2.22 sq mi)
- Highest elevation: 262 m (860 ft)
- Lowest elevation: 204 m (669 ft)
- Population (2023): 59
  - Density: 10/km^{2} (27/sq mi)
- Time zone: UTC+01:00 (CET)
  - Summer (DST): UTC+02:00 (CEST)
- INSEE/Postal code: 70574 /70180
- ^{1} French Land Register data, which excludes lakes, ponds, glaciers > 1 km^{2} (0.386 sq mi or 247 acres) and river estuaries.

Volon (French pronunciation: [vɔlɔ̃]) is a commune in the Haute-Saône department in the region of Bourgogne-Franche-Comté in eastern France.

== Notable people ==
- Jean Michel Claude Richard (1787–1868), botanist, born in Volon

== See also ==
- Communes of the Haute-Saône department
