= Asterolecaniidae =

Scientific classification
- Kingdom: Animalia
- Phylum: Arthropoda
- Class: Insecta
- Order: Hemiptera
- Suborder: Sternorrhyncha
- Superfamily: Coccoidea
- Family: Asterolecaniidae; Cockerell, 1896

Genera
- See text

Family of true bugs

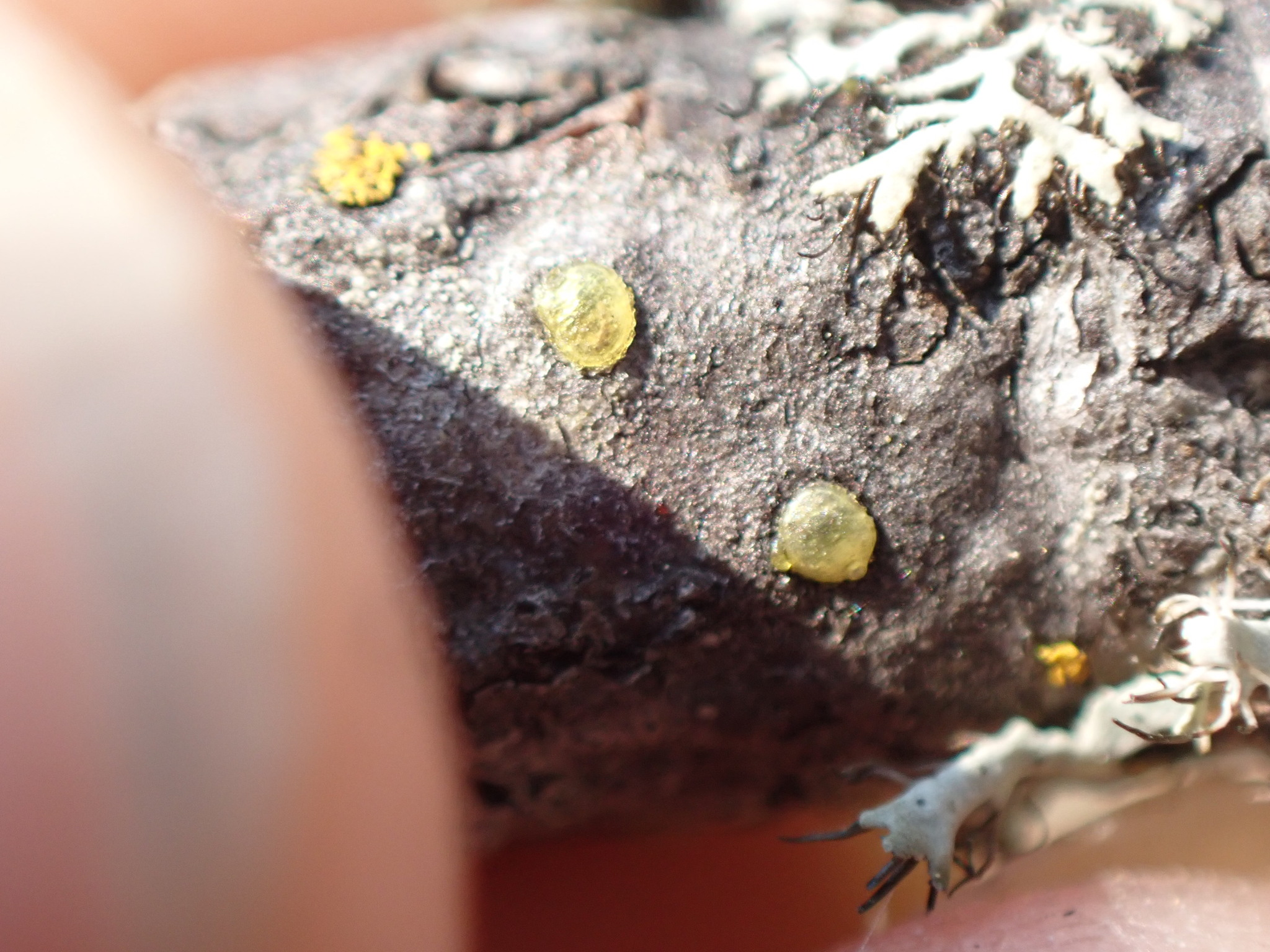
Asterodiaspis variolosa

Asterolecaniidae is a family of scale insects commonly known as pit scales or asterolecaniids. They typically cause a depression in the host plant's tissues and often cause distortion of the shoots. They are found on a range of hosts but are especially common on oaks, bamboos and a number of ornamental plants. Members of this family occur in most regions of the world but are most abundant in the northern hemisphere. There are about 25 genera and 243 recorded species.

== Life cycle ==
Pit scales in this family have three female instars and five male instars. They are generally found on the leaves or shoots of the host plant and often cause deformation. The body is usually covered by a clear or transparent test. Eggs are laid under this and occupy the cavity formed as the adult female dies and shrinks in the autumn. Males are not usually found but when they do occur, they develop under a test in a similar fashion to the females.

== Genera ==
- Abditicoccus
- Acanthococcus
- Amorphococcus
- Asterodiaspis
- Asterolecanium
- Bambusaspis
- Elegatis
- Endernia
- Frenchia
- Grammococcus
- Hsuia
- Hyalococcus
- Liuaspis
- Mycetococcus
- Mycococcus
- Neoasterodiaspis
- Oacoccus
- Palmaspis
- Pauroaspis
- Planchonia
- Polea
- Pollinia
- Russellaspis
- Sclerosococcus
- Trachycoccus
