= Asterolecanium =

Scientific classification
- Kingdom: Animalia
- Phylum: Arthropoda
- Class: Insecta
- Order: Hemiptera
- Suborder: Sternorrhyncha
- Family: Asterolecaniidae
- Genus: Asterolecanium; Targioni-tozzetti, 1868

Species
- See text

Genus of true bugs

Asterolecanium is a genus of pit scale insects. Asterolecanium is distributed worldwide: species have been found in each of the six biogeographic realms, and nearly all of their respective subregions.

Many species of Asterolecanium are destructive to crops and other plants of economic importance such as bamboo and oak, and are therefore considered pests. Asterolecanium species have been found on at least 37 plant families, most prominently Gramineae (grasses), Palmae (palm trees), and Fagaceae (beech trees). Some species prefer a single host, while others feed on multiple host species. Some feed only on a single part of a plant, such as leaves or stems, while others infest the whole plant. Some create pits in their hosts, depending on the susceptibility of the host plant to damage.

== Species ==
- Asterolecanium abiectum Russell
- Asterolecanium acaciae Morrison & Morrison
- Asterolecanium acutulum Russell
- Asterolecanium adjunctum Russell
- Asterolecanium amboinae Russell
- Asterolecanium boliviae Russell
- Asterolecanium borboniae Brain
- Asterolecanium borneese Russell
- Asterolecanium bornmuelleri Ruebsaamen
- Asterolecanium brevispinum Brain
- Asterolecanium brunetae Russell
- Asterolecanium captiosum Russell
- Asterolecanium castaneae Russell
- Asterolecanium chinae Russell
- Asterolecanium circulare Russell
- Asterolecanium coffeae Newstead, 1911
- Asterolecanium conimbrigense Saraiva, 1936
- Asterolecanium conspicuum Brain
- Asterolecanium corallinum Takahashi, 1908
- Asterolecanium delicatum Green
- Asterolecanium difficile Russell
- Asterolecanium disiunctum Russell
- Asterolecanium distinctum Russell
- Asterolecanium elongatum Russell
- Asterolecanium epidendri (Bouché, 1844)
- Asterolecanium euphorbiae Russell
- Asterolecanium euryopsis Fuller
- Asterolecanium exiguum Green
- Asterolecanium flagellariae Russell
- Asterolecanium florum Russell
- Asterolecanium fusum Russell
- Asterolecanium garciniae Russell
- Asterolecanium gemmae Russell
- Asterolecanium gilvum Russell
- Asterolecanium grandiculum Russell
- Asterolecanium greeni Marchal
- Asterolecanium gutta Green
- Asterolecanium hakeae Fuller
- Asterolecanium hilli Green
- Asterolecanium inconspicuum Russell
- Asterolecanium ingae Russell
- Asterolecanium inlabefactum Russell
- Asterolecanium inusitatum Russell
- Asterolecanium japonica Cockerell, 1900
- Asterolecanium javae Russell
- Asterolecanium lacrimula Russell
- Asterolecanium largum Russell
- Asterolecanium launeae Russell
- Asterolecanium longulum Russell
- Asterolecanium longum
- Asterolecanium luteolum Russell
- Asterolecanium machili Russell, 1941
- Asterolecanium medium Russell
- Asterolecanium miliaris (Boisduval, 1869)
- Asterolecanium minicum Russell
- Asterolecanium minus
- Asterolecanium minusculum Russell
- Asterolecanium minutum Takahashi, 1930
- Asterolecanium multiporum
- Asterolecanium nitidum Russell
- Asterolecanium notatum Lambdin
- Asterolecanium oblongum Russell
- Asterolecanium oraniae Russell
- Asterolecanium ordinarium Russell
- Asterolecanium pallidum Russell
- Asterolecanium parvum Russell
- Asterolecanium penicillatum Russell
- Asterolecanium perplexum Russell
- Asterolecanium pinangae Russell
- Asterolecanium proboscidis Russell
- Asterolecanium pseudolanceoleatum Takahashi, 1933
- Asterolecanium pseudomiliaris Green, 1922
- Asterolecanium psychotriae Russell, 1941
- Asterolecanium pusillum Russell
- Asterolecanium pustulans (Cockerell, 1892)
- Asterolecanium puteanum Russell
- Asterolecanium quadrisetosum Russell
- Asterolecanium quaesitum Russell
- Asterolecanium rehi Rübsaamen, 1902
- Asterolecanium robustum Green, 1908
- Asterolecanium rubrocomatum Green
- Asterolecanium sabalis Russell
- Asterolecanium sanbernardensis Hempel
- Asterolecanium sasae Russell
- Asterolecanium scirrosis Russell, 1941
- Asterolecanium seabrai Saraiva, 1936
- Asterolecanium semisepultum Russell
- Asterolecanium simile Russell
- Asterolecanium simplex Russell
- Asterolecanium singulare Russell
- Asterolecanium skanianae Russell
- Asterolecanium subdolum Russell
- Asterolecanium subventruosum Russell
- Asterolecanium thespesiae Green
- Asterolecanium townsendi Cockerell
- Asterolecanium transversus Morrison & Morrison
- Asterolecanium truncatum Russell
- Asterolecanium ungulatum Russell
- Asterolecanium unicum Russell
- Asterolecanium urichi Cockerell
- Asterolecanium victoriae Russell
- Asterolecanium viridulum (Cockerell)
- Asterolecanium vitreum Russell
- Asterolecanium vulgare Russell
- Asterolecanium zanthens Russell
