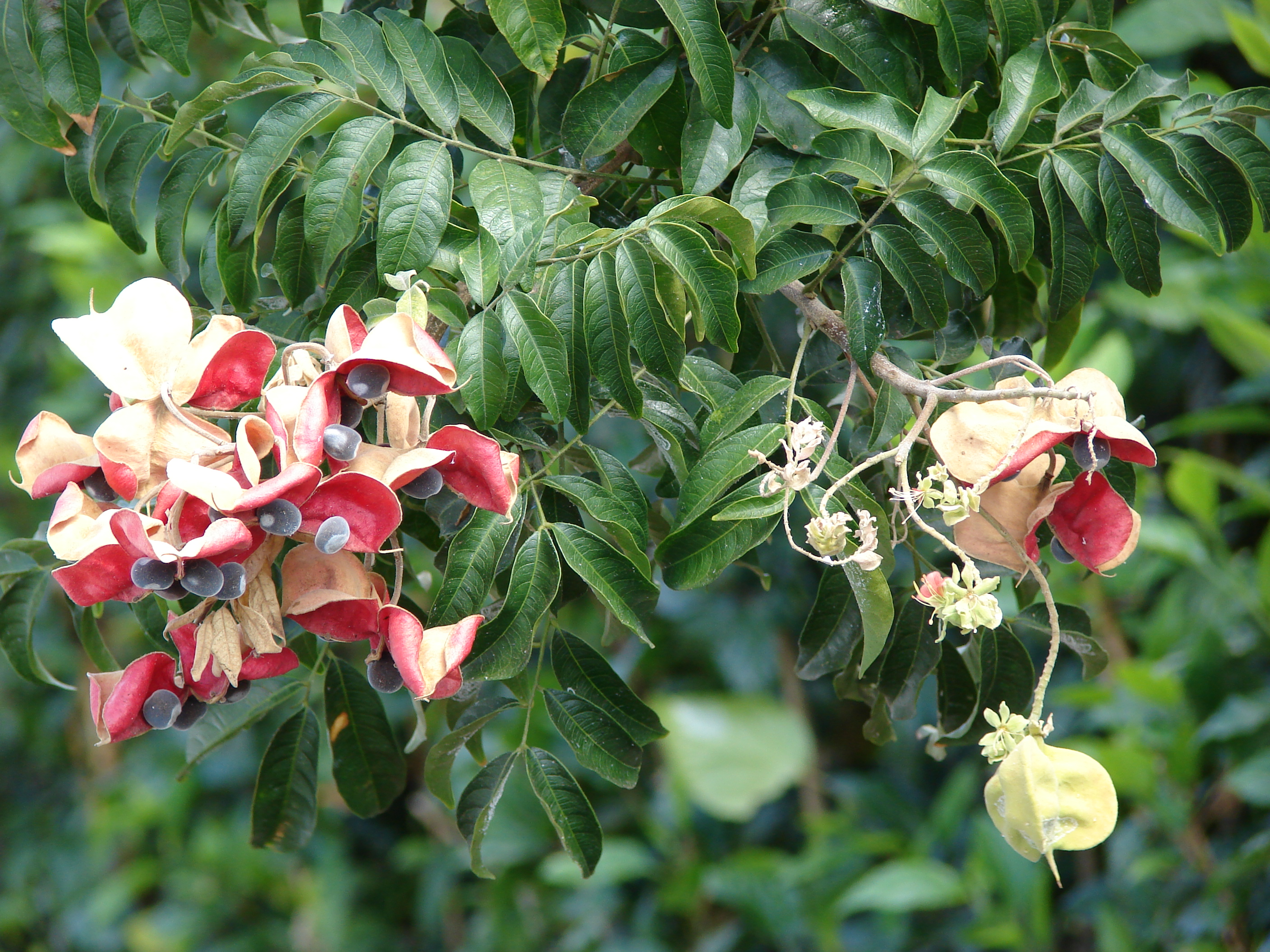

Scientific classification
- Kingdom: Plantae
- Clade: Tracheophytes
- Clade: Angiosperms
- Clade: Eudicots
- Clade: Rosids
- Order: Sapindales
- Family: Sapindaceae
- Genus: Majidea
- Species: M. zanguebarica

Binomial name
- Majidea zanguebarica Kirk ex Oliv.

= Majidea zanguebarica =

Species of tree

Majidea zangueberica (also known as the mgambo tree, black pearl tree or velvet seed tree) is a small tree of the family Sapindaceae. The tree is native to East Africa and grows up to 5 metres (16 ft) tall.

== Description ==
This very ornamental small tree has shiny foliage with an attractive rounded canopy, making it very suitable for small tropical gardens or a container plant in cooler climates. They are hardy only in frost-free zones, otherwise they can make a rare and unique houseplant as they are smaller when container grown. The leaves are compound with up to 10 pairs of leaflets, which are elliptic about 5–7 centimetres (2.0–2.8 in) long and 2–3 cm (0.79–1.18 in) wide. Its highly ornamental seeds mean it's sometimes referred to as the black pearl tree or velvet-seed tree.

It blooms with dense clusters of small green-red, fragrant flowers at the end of panicles. Fruit is spherical with three lobes, 3 cm (1.2 in) long. The fruit splits open, showing the bright red interior, with three spherical, velvety blue-black seeds.

== Uses ==
The seeds are often used in artisan jewelry and the dried pods in flower arrangements, the composition of bouquets and decorative potpourri.
