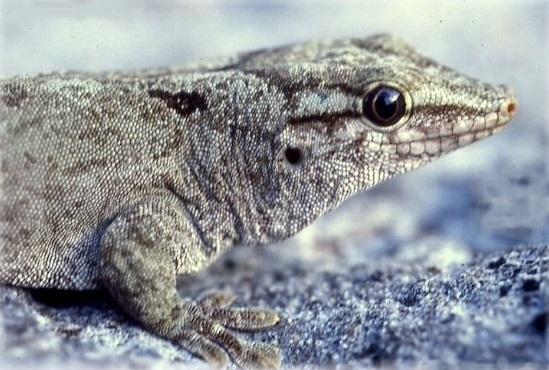

Conservation status
- Vulnerable (IUCN 3.1)

Scientific classification
- Kingdom: Animalia
- Phylum: Chordata
- Class: Reptilia
- Order: Squamata
- Suborder: Gekkota
- Family: Gekkonidae
- Genus: Phelsuma
- Species: P. guentheri

Binomial name
- Phelsuma guentheri Boulenger, 1885

= Round Island day gecko =

Species of lizard

The Round Island day gecko (Phelsuma guentheri), also known commonly as Günther's gecko, is an endangered species of lizard in the family Gekkonidae. The species is endemic to the islet Round Island, Mauritius, and typically dwells on palm trees. The Round Island day gecko feeds on insects and nectar.

== Etymology ==
The specific name, guentheri, is in honor of German-born British herpetologist Albert Günther.

== Description ==
P. guentheri is one of the largest living day geckos. Males can reach a total length (including tail) of about 30 cm (12 in), but often are much smaller. Females of this species are generally very much smaller than males. The body color is grayish or grayish brown. A dark-brown stripe extends from the nostril to above the ear opening. On the back, dark spots may be present. In some individuals, the legs and toes have light-yellow bars. The ventral side is white or yellowish.

== Geographic range ==
P. guentheri originally occurred on Mauritius before rats and cats were introduced. Now, it inhabits only Round Island, 22 km (14 mi) north-northeast of Mauritius.

== Habitat ==
P. guentheri is often found on bottle palms, fan palms (Latania loddigesii), and Pandanus. Since much of the original vegetation is destroyed, by tropical cyclones, P. guentheri is forced to live in rocky crevices.

== Diet ==
The Round Island day gecko feeds on various insects and other invertebrates. It also licks soft, sweet fruit, pollen, and nectar.

== Reproduction ==
Adult females of P. guentheri lay up to four pairs of eggs. The young will hatch after about 58–104 days. The juveniles measure 75 mm (3.0 in). The eggs are laid normally in June, but can be laid from February to September.

== Care and maintenance in captivity ==
P. guentheri is endangered and was bred and kept by the Durrell Wildlife Conservation Trust at Durrell Wildlife Park until 1999.
