= Jean Nicolas Bréon =

French botanist (1785–1864)

Jean Nicolas Bréon (27 September 1785, Sierck – 1864, Noyon), often known as Nicolas Bréon, was a noted French plant collector and botanist.

From 1809 he worked as a student gardener at the Muséum national d'histoire naturelle in Paris, later serving as a botanist/gardener at the botanical garden in Ajaccio (1813). In February 1815 he was named a gardener-botanist of the French Navy. Bréon was the first director (1817–1831) of the Jardin du Roy (now the Jardin de l'État) in the Île Bourbon (now Réunion). During his time on Réunion, he organized several botanical trips to Madagascar, the Maldives and the Arabian Peninsula.

The genus Breonia was named in his honor by botanist Achille Richard — the genus Breonadia (family Rubiaceae) is most likely named after him.

== Selected works ==
- Catalogue des plantes cultivées au Jardin botanique et de naturalisation de île Bourbon, Saint-Denis, Ile Bourbon : Impr du Gouvernement, 1820.
- Supplément au catalogue des plantes cultivées aux jardins royaux de l'île Bourbon, Saint-Denis, Ile Bourbon : [s.n.], 1822.
- Catalogue des oignons et bulbes à fleurs qui se trouvent chez, Paris : impr. Pollet, (circa 1840).
