= Île Ronde, Mauritius =

Uninhabited island in Mauritius

Coordinates: 19.850037°S 57.783333°E

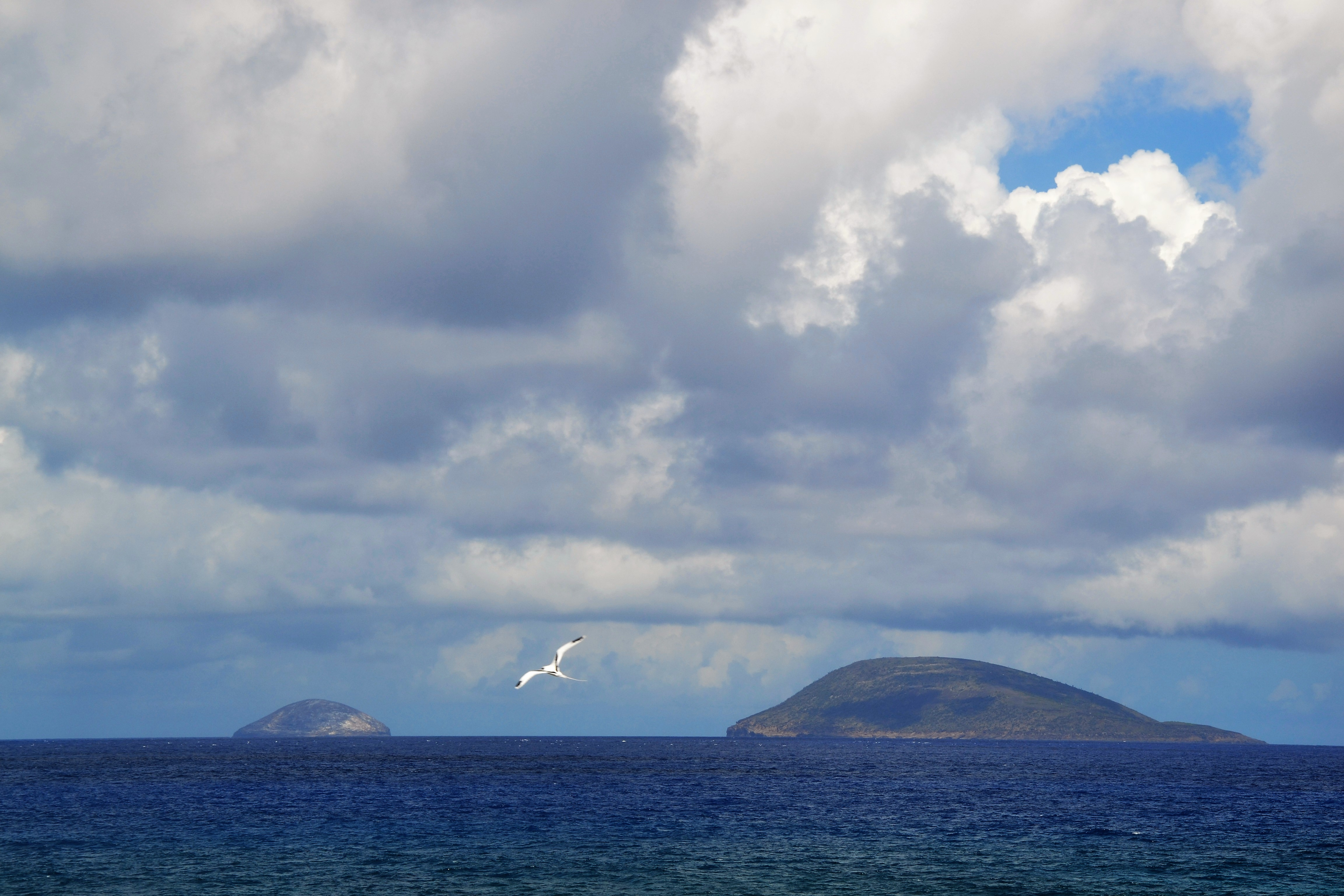
Round Island seen from West, with Serpent Island to the right (north) of it

Round Island is an uninhabited islet 22.5 kilometres north of Mauritius. It has an area of 1.69 square kilometres and a maximum elevation of 280 metres. The island has been a nature reserve since 1957 and is administered jointly by the National Parks and Conservation Service and the Mauritian Wildlife Foundation. The island has been designated an Important Bird Area (IBA) by BirdLife International.

== Round Island restoration project ==
Round Island represents one of the longest-running island restoration projects in the world, having been designated a nature reserve in 1957 through the work of the then Colonial Secretary, Robert Newton (a "keen bird-watcher"), and several others who realized the nesting birds faced a direct threat from people - mainly fishermen who would catch them for food. Many of the biological records supporting conservation status and subsequent work were taken by Jean Vinson O. B. E., a Mauritian zoologist and Director of the Mauritius Institute, who conducted a field survey of Round Island as early as 1948 that provided "...the first serious report on its fauna since 1869". Round Island was visited again in 1952, 1954, and 1957 for further field surveys, showing stable (albeit low) vegetation populations despite the goats and rabbits (goats were introduced between 1846 and 1868, whilst rabbits were present in large numbers before 1810). In 1963, Vinson returned to Round Island but was shocked to find that the cyclones of 1960 and 1962 had severely reduced the number of palms and screw-pines on the island; many plant species had been "practically decimated". Vinson realized the island's tree populations were unstable after the unusually frequent cyclones, and this was exacerbated by the introduced goats and rabbits that grazed on the new growth, which would have replaced the fallen trees. Without the trees to populate and cover the land, Round Island's topsoil could easily be eroded by wind or rain, effectively making it an ecological wasteland. With this in mind, Vinson made it clear that eradicating the invasive rabbits and goats was paramount to ensuring the long-term survival of the Round Island flora and fauna. To bring this to fruition, "...he toured international conservation bodies in 1964, and submitted a special report to the IUCN in 1965". This likely led to the first international magazine article on the conservation of Round Island's fauna. Local action to exterminate the goats and rabbits also sprang up from Vinson's campaigning, but this was too sporadic to have any real impact, and even these local efforts ceased after Vinson's unexpected death in May, 1966.

Over the next decade, sporadic hunting and various political impediments resulted in little change to the survival of introduced goat and rabbit populations, leading to the island's endemic tree populations dwindling. In 1976, however, Gerald Durrell and the Jersey Wildlife Preservation Trust (now the Durrell Wildlife Conservation Trust, DWCT) sponsored the conservation of critically endangered birds in Mauritius and the ecological restoration of Round Island. In the same year, a systematic program of eradication began that eventually removed the goat population by 1979 and in 1986, a team led by Don Merton eradicated the rabbit population using the newly-developed poison brodifacoum. By the time both goats and rabbits had been eradicated from Round Island, Gerald Durrell and the DWCT had negotiated a conservation agreement with the new government (in 1984) that initially focused on the endemic vertebrates, but led to a closer relationship that "helped create the local capacity and infrastructure for effective species management".

Since removal of the introduced herbivores, the Round Island plant community has dramatically recovered. This is especially stark for the four endemics Latania loddigesii, Dictyosperma album, Pandanus vandermeerschii and Hyophorbe lagenicaulis, which constituted a large portion of the Round Island forest historically. This has led to six reptile species recovering in tandem with the plant community; these are the skinks Leiolopisma telfaririi and Gongylomorphus bojerii, the geckos Phelsuma guentheri, P. ornata and Nactus serpensinsula, and the snake Casarea dussumieri.

Much of the continuing conservation work on Round Island revolves around removing the introduced plants and invertebrates.

== Endemic species ==
Rare reptiles that are endemic to Round Island include the Round Island skink, Round Island day gecko, Round Island boa, and the extinct Round Island burrowing boa.

Rare plants endemic to the island include the bottle palm and Dictyosperma album var. conjugatum.

== Birds ==
The five species of birds that can be seen from the island are the white-tailed tropicbird, red-tailed tropicbird, Trinidade petrel, masked booby and wedge-tailed shearwater.

== Military history ==
The inconclusive Battle of Île Ronde was fought off the island by British and French naval squadrons on 22 October 1794.

== See also ==
- Ile Plate
- Wildlife of Mauritius
