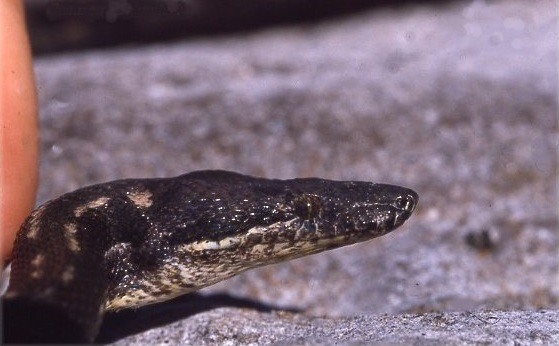

Conservation status
- Vulnerable (IUCN 3.1)
- CITES Appendix I

Scientific classification
- Kingdom: Animalia
- Phylum: Chordata
- Class: Reptilia
- Order: Squamata
- Suborder: Serpentes
- Family: Bolyeriidae
- Genus: Casarea; Gray, 1842
- Species: C. dussumieri

Binomial name
- Casarea dussumieri (Schlegel, 1837)

Synonyms
- Genus: Casarae Gray, 1842; Leptoboa A.M.C. Duméril & Bibron, 1844; Species: Boa dussumiri Schlegel, 1837 (typographical error); Boa Dussumieri Schlegel, 1837; Boa Dussumieri — Gray, 1842; Casarea dussumieri — Gray, 1842; Leptoboa dussumieri — A.M.C. Duméril & Bibron, 1844; Casarea dussumieri — Boulenger, 1893

= Round Island boa =

Species of snake

The Round Island boa (Casarea dussumieri), also known commonly as the Round Island keel-scaled boa and the Round Island ground boa, is a species of nonvenomous snake in the monotypic genus Casarea in the family Bolyeriidae. The species is endemic to Round Island, Mauritius. No subspecies are currently recognized.

== Etymology ==
The specific name, dussumieri, is in honor of Jean-Jacques Dussumier, a French merchant, ship owner, and collector of zoological specimens.

== Description ==
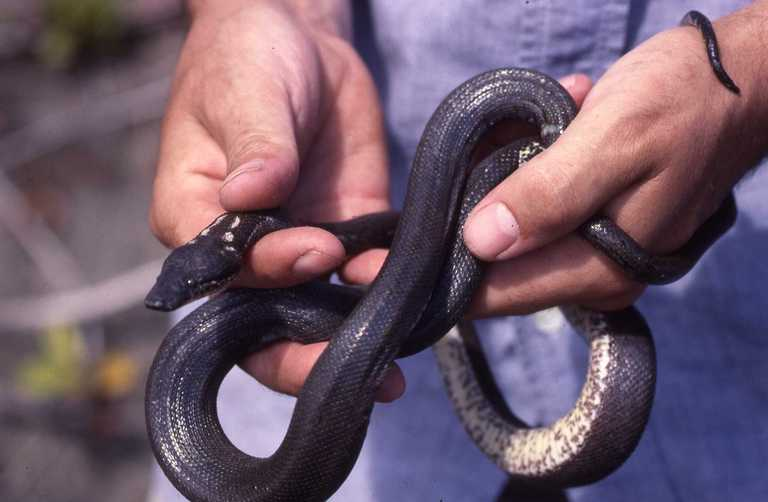
Adult female

Adults of C. dussumieri are slender and reach a maximum total length (including tail) of 150 cm (5 ft). The males have slimmer, more pointed heads and have shorter bodies than the females. The body is covered in small keeled scales that give the species one of its common names. The genus is unique among extant vertebrates as it has a split jaw (intramaxilliary joint that separates anterior and posterior bones), an adaptation that may be advantageous in catching its main prey of geckos and skinks.

The colour pattern is dark brown dorsally, the belly being lighter with dark spots. Over a 24-hour period the boa has a shift in colour, changing from "dark" during its relatively inactive day time period to "light" in the early evening through to dawn when it is most active. This effect is created through polychromatic skin cells.

== Geographic range ==
C. dussumieri is known to survive on Round Island, but has been recorded on the islands of Gunner's Quoin, Flat Island, Ile de la Pas, and on mainland Mauritius (as subfossil remains).

The type locality is "I'île ronde, près de Maurice" (Round Island, Mauritius).

Between 11 and 31 October 2012 the boa was reintroduced into Gunner's Quoin as part of a joint collaborative project involving the Durrell Wildlife Conservation Trust, the Mauritian Wildlife Foundation, and the National Parks and Conservation Service of Mauritius.

== Conservation status ==
The species C. dussumieri is classified as Endangered (E) on the IUCN Red List for the following criteria: D (v2.3, 1994). This means that, although it is not critically endangered, for some time it has faced a very high risk of extinction in the wild. In 1996 the population was estimated to number less than 250 mature individuals.

Recent conservation efforts have seen an increase in the number of adult Round Island boas to around 1,000. This has been achieved by eradicating goats and rabbits from the island and restoring natural habitat, which has led to an increase of the Round Island boas' natural prey, lizards. In recent breeding efforts, Round Island boas in captivity have been fed by scenting small mice with chicken thigh meat.

== Reproduction ==
In C. dussumieri, breeding begins during April, although young have been observed throughout the year. A clutch of up to 12 soft-shelled eggs may be laid amongst leaf litter or in hollow palm trunks, and is sometimes attended by the female. Incubation is unusually long for a snake, lasting about 90 days. The young are bright orange at birth and weigh less than 5 grams (0.18 oz).
