= List of Indigenous peoples actions that conflict with conservation principles =

In the modern era, conservationists often clash with Indigenous peoples over actions by the Indigneous peoples that the conservationists consider to be harmful to the environment. Examples of these conflicts are summarized in this article. (Note: The scope of this article is described in the Talk page at Talk:List_of_Indigenous_peoples_actions_that_conflict_with_conservation_principles#Scope_of_article. That link may be outdated if the discussion has moved into the Talk page archive.)

== Views of conservation by Indigenous peoples ==
A common view among Westerners was that prehistoric Indigenous cultures universally lived in perfect harmony with nature and endeavored to conserve and protect the environment. (Note: As early as the 1700s, Europeans were under the mistaken belief that Indigenous peoples (particularly in the New World) had not significantly altered their environment.) This notion is referred to as the "myth of the ecological noble savage". (Note: The term "ecological Indian" is also used, in a North American context, for the notion of ecological noble savage.) This myth is a recent variant of the noble savage cultural stereotype, which originated several hundred years ago in the Western imagination. (Note: The phrase "ecologically noble savage" was first used to describe the myth in 1990.) During the environmental movement of the 1970s, the myth of the ecological noble savage became widespread. (Note: The myth of the ecologically noble savage is often applied in the context of North America, but is also applied in Asia, South America, Australia, and other places in the world.) The consensus of academics is that the concept of the ecological noble savage was essentially false, and that prehistoric peoples impacted their habitat in virtually all places they inhabited, resulting in significant, permanent changes to the ecosystem, including – in some cases – extinction of species and deforestation. (Note: According to the archaeologist Patrick Vinton Kirch: "The study of human ecodynamics also needs to confront head on the issue of how past human societies perceived (or failed to perceive) environmental impacts, how social systems themselves adapted or responded to change, and the degree to which such systems could be resilient over long time cycles.")

When considering the impacts of Indigenous cultures on the environment, some scholars distinguish cultures that are ecologists from cultures that are conservationists. The anthropologist Shepard Krech, in his work The Ecological Indian, analyzed the Indigenous peoples of North America and concluded that they (prior to the 20th century) were ecologists because they were deeply aware of the interrelationships between humans, animals, and nature; but they were not not conservationists because they did not avoid waste and did not preserve resources for future availability. (Note: According to the anthropologist Peter Stahl, some Native American cultures may have displayed an conservation ethic, but many did not.)

== Applicability of modern conservation ethics to prehistoric and Indigenous peoples ==
Research into the myth of the ecological noble savage generated new discussions about whether modern values of conservation and sustainability are applicable to prehistoric or Indigenous cultures. Analysis was sometimes dependent on the scientific discipline: conservation scientists and ecologists tend to treat major habitat modifications as disturbances or disruptions, whereas archaeologists and anthropologists tend to view the changes as the natural evolutionary process of niche construction.

Some scholars contend that it is inappropriate to apply Western concepts of ecology or conservation to Indigenous peoples or subsistence cultures. (Note: The anthropologist Eric Alden Smith contends that approaches to conservation that emphasize preserving pristine wilderness are only feasible for urban, wealthy societies, and may not be appropriate for subsistence cultures.) Many modern Native Americans view the Western concept of nature conservation as inherently flawed, since they view themselves as living within nature. (Note: There is no universally accepted definition of "nature conservation", but two common approaches are (a) focusing on the outcome: maintaining populations, environments, and biodiversity in near-original state; or (b) focusing on processes: implementing practices that prevent or mitigate habitat degradation and species declines.)

The myth of the noble savage has been applied to political ends in two ways: Indigenous peoples have used the myth to support their arguments for equality and self determination. And conservation organizations have used the myth to generate support for their causes. The anthropologist Mac Chapin criticized several major conservation organizations in 2004, claiming their drives to preserve wilderness in an untouched state was harmful to Indigenous communities that lived in or near those preserves. The philosopher Douglas Buege contends that the myth of the ecologically noble savage has been applied by Western conservationists in a way that is harmful to modern Indigenous cultures.

The suggestion that a pristine wilderness, untouched by humans, is an ideal or desirable condition has been criticized as a racist or ethnocentric social construct. The philosopher J. Baird Callicott wrote that the idea of wilderness is "alleged [by various authors] to be ethnocentric, androcentric, phallogocentric, unscientific, unphilosophic, impolitic, outmoded, even genocidal". An alternative to the notion of pristine wilderness is a "humanized landscape" or "humanized nature", defined as habitat that has been modified by humans to suit their needs and enable them to survive. The historian William Cronon argues that the normal, natural state of a landscape incorporates those modifications by humans required for their society to grow and thrive. Many people in the Chinese culture believe that humanized nature is more beautiful than pristine wilderness.

Indigenous peoples, although often acting as stewards of the environment, are not monolithic.

In these conflicts, conservationists typically claim the Indigenous peoples are damaging the environment in a wasteful manner, and Indigenous claim the conservationists do not comprehend their traditional values. Accusations of racism sometimes emerge in these conflicts. (Note: Some non-Indigenous people protested when Chippewa Native Americans used modern technologies to exercise their fishing rights.)

== List ==
- Construction of modern houses by Miccosukee peoples within Everglades National Park
- Navajo peoples permitted mining of uranium on their lands
- Hunting of harp seals by Inuit in Canada's arctic
- The Makah tribe's grey whale hunts (Note: The 1999 whale hunt was authorized; the 2007 hunt was unauthorized and the whale sank after being shot.)
- Alaskan Athabaskans hunting beluga whales in Cook Inlet to consume and sell muktuk
- Mi'kmaq and Maliseet peoples logging in Canada in areas considered off-limits
- The Goshute peoples signed a contract with Private Fuel Storage, a private corporation, to store nuclear waste on their Skull Valley Indian Reservation
- Permitting exploitation of natural gas, oil, and coal
- Supporting the construction of dams in Canada, under the James Bay and Northern Quebec Agreement
- Unkechaug and Shinnecock peoples attempting to harvest protected fish and shellfish in Long Island Sound
- The Chugach Indigenous peoples of Alaska proposed a 30-mile long road through sensitive habitat, to enable logging on their lands
- Harvesting lobsters without permits and out of season in Canada
- Fishing disputes in US
- Hopi Native Americans endorsing strip mining
- Inupiat peoples killing caribou in a wasteful manner
- Chippewa peoples wasting fish
- Crow Native Americans wastefully killing elk
- Ute peoples planning to build a dam and reservoir on their lands, an proposal opposed by the Sierra Club
- Chippewa fishermen taking fish that were carrying eggs
- Northern Cheyenne and Crow peoples endorsing strip mining on their lands
- The Osage peoples opposed creation of the Tallgrass Prairie National Preserve because it would jeopardize oil revenues for the tribe
- The Campo Band of Mission Indians offered to create a solid waste dump on their lands, over the opposition of neighbors
- The Tonkawa and Yakima tribes considered nuclear waste dumps on their lands
- The chief of the Choctaw peoples, Phillip Martin, proposed a hazardous waste dump, which was opposed by other members of the tribe.
- The Mescalero Apache peoples offered to store nuclear waste on their lands
- Inupiat hunted whales wastefully in the 1970s, and fought against a global ban on whaling
- The Inupiat wanted to kill grey whales that were trapped in the ice, while environmental groups wanted to free them
- Native Americans in Alaska, including Tlingit peoples and the Sealaska Corporation, encouraged clear-cutting of forests
- The Inupiat supported drilling for oil in the Arctic National Wildlife Refuge
- The Council of Energy Resource Tribes has endorsed development and exploitation of wilderness tribal lands

== See also ==
- Environmental impacts of prehistoric humans
