= Prehistoric human impacts on the environment =

==== Heading text ====
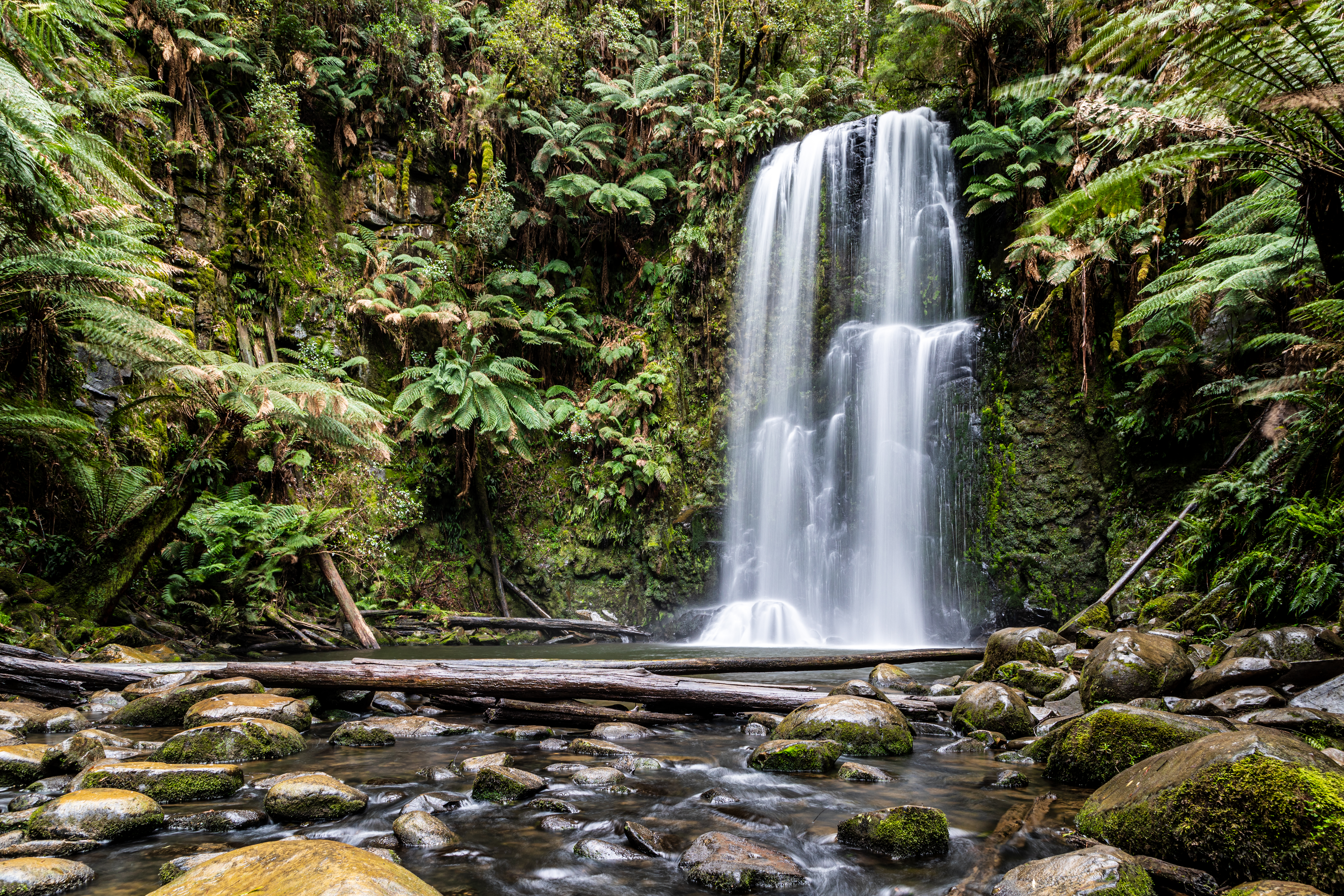
A waterfall in an Australian national park

Prehistoric human impacts on the environment are ecosystem modifications that were caused by prehistoric (Note: This article addresses only the impacts of prehistoric societies (those that did not yet have a writing system). Because the adoption of writing across the globe occurred at different times in different places, the activities included in this article are not subject to a single cut-off date. For more recent impacts, see Human impacts on the environment.) societies. Long before the modern era, humans (Note: The term "humans" is used in this article to refer to any hominins, including anatomically modern humans (Homo sapiens) and other hominins such as Neanderthals and Homo erectus. For categories of hominins involved in megafauna extinctions, see Lemoine 2023, pp. 2–3 and Erlandson 2013, pp. 1–5. Studies that consider Neanderthals include Fordham 2024, Gretzinger 2019, and Andermann 2020. Studies that consider H. erectus include Sandom 2014, Erlandson 2013, and Dembitzer 2022. Denisovan hominins are considered by Lemoine 2023.) altered the environment in every continent except Antarctica. These transformations were not as intensive as the impacts seen in the Industrial Age, but in some places the landscape was affected to such an extent that a major reorganization of society was required, for example in Southwest Asia and in Central America. By 12,000 years ago, more than 95% of Earth's temperate forests and 90% of its tropical forests were inhabited and altered by humans.

Impacts on the environment were produced by all types of human societies, including hunter-gatherers (which caused the earliest modifications), pastoralists, and agricultural societies. Early humans cleared land, harvested wood, and set fires. In the First Agricultural Revolution, beginning around 11,000 years ago, humans began to cultivate crops, causing environmental impacts to accelerate rapidly. Transformations from agriculture included soil erosion, nutrient depletion, and salinization. Prehistoric agricultural activities also increased atmospheric greenhouse gases such as carbon dioxide and methane – long before air pollution from coal and petroleum became common.

Humans introduced large numbers of domesticated animals (such as cattle, sheep, goats, pigs, and dogs) into ecosystems, which contributed to deforestation, habitat alteration, and soil erosion. Some introductions were deliberate, but some were inadvertent (rats, insects, and pathogens). Invasive species often had particularly devastating impacts on island ecosystems.

Beginning in the Late Pleistocene, many large land animal species went extinct, including woolly mammoths, saber-toothed cats, giant ground sloths, moa, and giant tortoises. Scientists are still researching and debating what caused the extinctions, but human activity (hunting, fire, and habitat alterations) was certainly a factor in many of the extinctions. Natural climatic changes (Note: This article uses the phrase "climatic change" to designate prehistoric natural climate changes not caused by humans, and uses "climate change" to designate modern, anthropogenic changes to the climate.) also contributed to some of the extinctions.

Major alterations to the environment were required for most societies to evolve and progress. Many prehistoric societies altered the environment in ways that increased biodiversity and enriched soil quality. Historical ecologists research prehistoric environmental impacts, and the studies may help address modern conservation challenges. The research also helps scientists define and understand the Anthropocene – the time period in which human activity has been a major influence on Earth's systems.

== History of research ==
Scientists from many disciplines study environmental impacts with methods such as ice cores, DNA, and modeling.

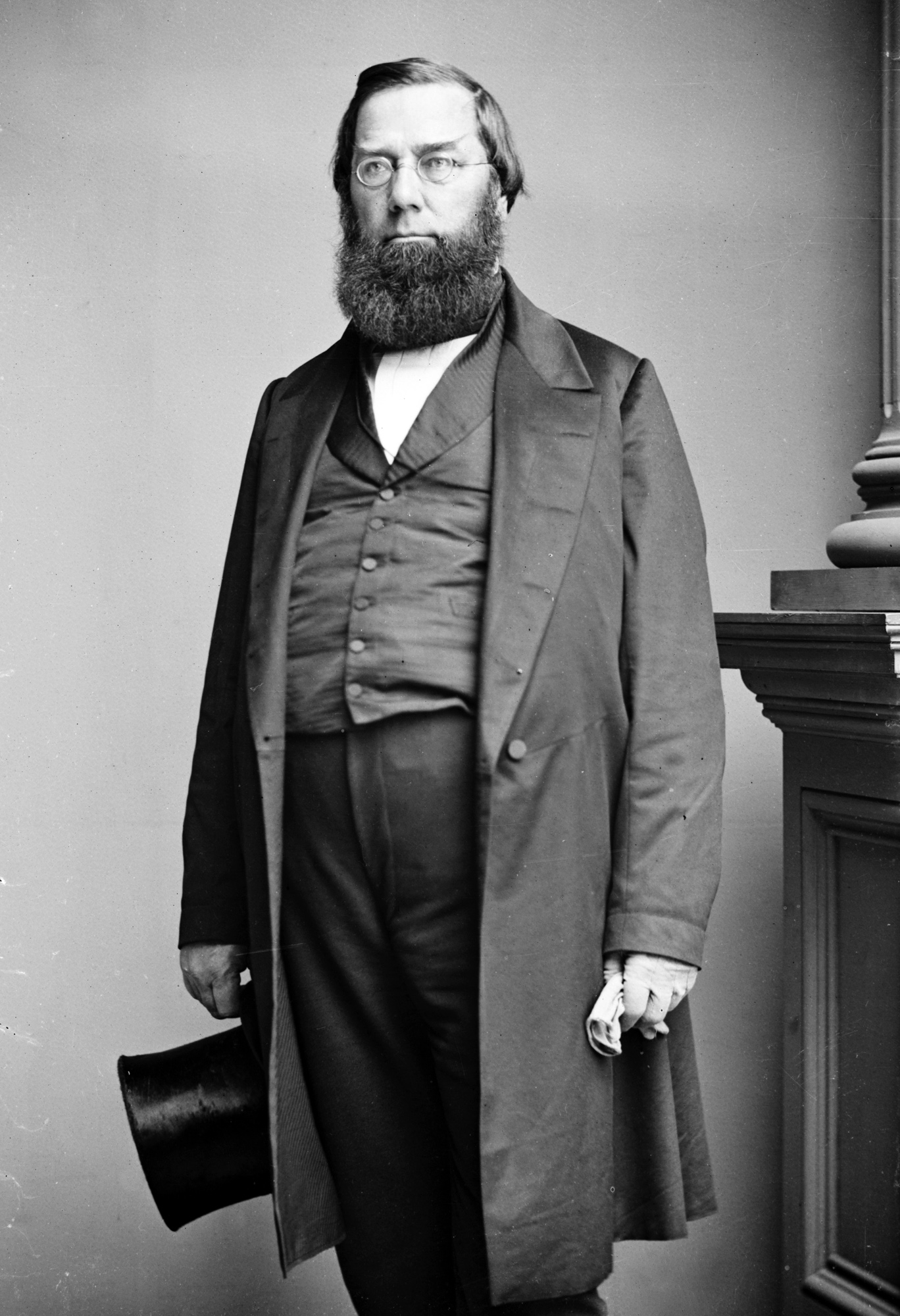
In 1864, George Perkins Marsh wrote one of the first works analyzing the environmental impacts of prehistoric peoples.

The study of historical impacts of humans on the environment is a multidisciplinary field investigated by anthropologists, archaeologists, paleontologists, ecologists, geographers, historians, and biologists. (Note: Various scientific disciplines sometimes exhibit notable differences in how they approach or treat human impacts.) Several overlapping disciplines study the field, including historical ecology, environmental archaeology, biogeography, and human ecodynamics. Other phrases used to describe all or part of the field of study include "human ecosystem engineering", "human-environment interaction in prehistory", "history of human impacts on global ecosystems", "ecological consequences of human niche construction", "human transformations of ecosystems", and "human alteration of ecology".

The academic study of historical alterations to the environment originated in 18th-century Europe, when serious studies of forestry practices began. An early hypothesis was the "Ruined Landscape" theory, which suggested that much of the Mediterranean's prehistoric forests had been cleared by humans. (Note: For insights into forestry practices in classical Europe, see Williams 2000, pp. 34–36.) Scientists in the 1800s proposed several hypotheses about why large mammals (such as mammoths and giant sloths) became extinct – including glaciation, Biblical flooding, natural climatic change, and hunting by humans. (Note: A very early suggestion that humans extirpated Holocene megafauna was in 1797, when the amateur naturalist George Turner wrote "With the agility and ferocity of the tiger; with a body of unequalled magnitude and strength, it is possible that the Mammoth may have been at once the terror of the forest and of man! – And may not the human race have made the extirpation of this terrific disturber a common cause?")

An early work that examined the impacts of prehistoric cultures on the environment was the 1867 book Man and Nature: or, Physical Geography as Modified by Human Action by George Perkins Marsh. Early 20th-century works on the subject include two by the geographer Carl O. Sauer: his 1925 monograph The Morphology of Landscape and his 1952 book Agricultural Origins and Dispersals. Academic research into the impacts of prehistoric peoples coalesced around a 1955 symposium titled Man’s Role in Changing the Face of the Earth funded by the Wenner-Gren Foundation for Anthropological Research. As late as 1966, some researchers doubted that humans caused any of the late Quaternary extinctions. In 1966, a major paper was published that explicitly claimed that human hunting caused many of the late Quaternary extinctions: "Africa and Pleistocene Overkill" by the geoscientist Paul Schultz Martin.

In 1971, the geographer Karl Butzer published Environment and Archaeology: An Ecological Approach to Prehistory, a landmark in the field of environmental archaeology. An early article that challenged the Western belief that New World wilderness was untouched by prehistoric peoples was the 1992 article "The Pristine Myth: The Landscape of the Americas in 1492" by the geographer William Denevan. The 1999 book The Ecological Indian: Myth and History by the anthropologist Shepard Krech discussed the Western perception that Indigenous peoples lived in harmony with nature.

In the early 21st century, research into the impacts of prehistoric peoples on the environment focused on several areas:

- Documenting and analyzing the impacts on prehistoric environments
- Reconstructing specific historical environments
- Assessing how natural climatic changes impacted prehistoric societies
- Studying how prehistoric humans adapted to their environments
- Applying novel data sources such as ancient DNA and microfossils

== Overview ==
Human-caused impacts on the environment – called anthropogenic impacts – increased significantly after the start of the Industrial Revolution in the 1700s, but humans have been altering their surroundings since they began to populate the Earth. Anthropogenic impacts were a consequence of the emergence of prehistoric human societies. Most prehistoric human societies transformed their environment to some degree, although the nature and extent of the alterations varied widely across the globe. (Note: Academic studies that emphasize regional variations (often on a per-continent basis) of human environmental impacts include: Broughton 2018, Doughty 2013, Ellis 2021a, Ellis 2021b, Koch 2006, Malhi 2016, Roberts 2024, Sandom 2014, Smith 2018, Stephens 2019, Stevens 2022, and Stewart 2025.) Prehistoric societies relied on three subsistence strategies: hunter-gatherer, agrarian, and pastoral. (Note: Hunter-gatherer societies arose before agricultural or pastoral societies. Agricultural societies may be divided into horticultural (without plows) and agrarian (with plows).) According to the anthropologist Donald Grayson, archaeological evidence demonstrates that environmental modifications by prehistoric humans are "substantial, complex, and very old".

=== Anthropogenic activities ===
Pastoralism (such as these sheep grazing) was an anthropogenic activity that impacted the environment.

The development of prehistoric societies involved activities such as foraging for food, hunting animals, using fire, growing crops, and raising livestock. Human activities that impact the environment are called "anthropogenic activities". (Note: The word anthropogenic means "originating in or caused by human activities". In the context of environmental science, an "anthropogenic activity" is a societal activity that impacts the environment. Related terms include "human activities" (when impacts are not emphasized), or "subsistence activities" (in the context of basic necessities), or "land uses" (in the context of terrestrial impacts).) Prehistoric anthropogenic activities cataloged by researchers include:

- Harvesting wood and clearing forests with the use of fire
- Hunting wildlife and foraging for food
- Domesticating and growing crops
- Domesticating, herding, and grazing livestock (pastoralism)
- Constructing irrigation systems, drainage ditches, dams, canals, terraces and other waterworks.
- Building settlements, road networks, and structures
- Sailing, which enabled migration to remote islands
- Mining metals, stones, and other materials

=== Chronology of activities ===
This map shows when the First Agricultural Revolution occurred around the world. Major changes to habitat always accompanied the adoption of agriculture.

This chart by the scientist Erle Ellis summarizes anthropogenic activities through the Holocene (time running from left to right). Each horizontal bar is one category of land use practices.

Some events related to prehistoric human impacts on the environment. Time runs from left to right.

Early hominins developed stone tools 2.5 million years ago, which enabled behavioral changes that gradually started to impact the environment. Early modern humans emerged in Africa around 250,000 years ago, and left the continent about 70,000 years ago. These hominins were capable of developing and exploiting technologies, enabling their descendants to cultivate crops, domesticate livestock, mine for metals, and drive other species to extinction. During the Late Pleistocene (about 129,000 to 12,000 years ago), humans engaged in hunter-gatherer subsistence strategies; hunting and the use of anthropogenic fire led to many large land animal extinctions (although natural climatic changes were likely a factor in many of the extinctions). An early extinction tied to human activity occurred around 47,000 years ago, when a large bird – Genyornis newtoni – became extinct in Australia, perhaps because of humans harvesting their eggs for food. (Note: Another early megafauna extinction tied to human activity is the cave bear, which went extinct about 25,000 years ago.)

The Last Glacial Period ended about 12,000 years ago, marking the start of the Holocene. (Note: The Holocene start date is about 11,700 years ago, or about 9,700 BCE.) Hunter-gatherer societies became widespread in the Holocene and the portion of the Earth's surface subject to intensive human activity began to increase. At that time, nearly three-quarters of Earth’s land was inhabited by humans, who started to modify the Earth's terrestrial ecosystems. Hunter-gatherers (including Neanderthals) continued to impact their ecosystems through fire and land use modifications, and by reducing the populations of large herbivores. Large animal extinctions continued during the Holocene, with human activity contributing to the extinction of species such as the woolly mammoth and giant ground sloth.

The intensity of impacts on the environment accelerated with the First Agricultural Revolution when humans began growing crops and living in settlements. This was not a single event around the world, but happened at various times, ranging from 11,000 to 3,000 years ago. The transition from hunter-gatherer societies to agricultural societies enabled larger and denser human populations and the emergence of complex societies and the pastoral and agricultural industries that were required to support them. Agricultural societies actively engaged with their ecosystems and constructed cultural niches. These developments accelerated the speed and magnitude of environmental modifications. (Note: Agricultural societies required far less land per person than hunter-gatherer societies, so people could live closer together and form villages. Densities increased from 0.1‍–‍0.4 persons per km^{2} to 100‍–‍250 per km^{2}. Agriculture enabled population densities of 100‍–‍250 per km^{2}. The density value 250 is associated with high-intensity cultivation with terracing or irrigation. These density values are before the Industrial Age.)

In addition to agriculture, pastoral societies (based on the domestication of livestock) spread across much of the world between about 11,000 and 3,000 years ago, and they played a major role in modifications to the landscape. In New Guinea, drainage ditches were built 9,000 years ago to drain swamps. Significant soil erosion (caused by deforestation) occurred 9,000 years ago in Syria. Irrigation systems and dams were created 8,000 years ago near Mesopotamia. 7,800 years ago, the first recorded anthropogenic geomorphological impacts occurred in New Guinea when upland activities led to erosion that deposited legacy sediments in downhill streams.

Copper smelting arose in Europe around 7,000 years ago; at the same time, boats and rafts were used for river transportation in prehistoric Egypt. Olive orchards were cultivated in the Southern Levant about 6,500 years ago, displacing native vegetation. About 6,000 years ago, some agricultural societies began to use plows, transitioning from horticultural societies to more intensive agrarian societies. Around the same time, early terraces were built in Yemen. The first large settlements (on rivers) were built in Mesopotamia about 6,000 years ago.

Around 5,500 years ago, urban centers and regional networks began to appear. These networks facilitated the exchange of plant and animal species, even between continents, and enabled technology and economic systems to develop and spread. Canals were first built in Mesopotamia about 4,000 years ago, and large fleets of boats were used to transport cargo. Long-distance ocean sailing also began around 4,000 years ago, leading to the extinction of thousands of animal species as Polynesians spread across the Pacific. Engineered dams and embankments were built 3,000 years ago in China. High-intensity agriculture began to emerge around 1,000 BCE in the Near East, Asia, and Europe. Subsequent activities that were conducted by societies with writing systems are outside the scope of this article, and may be described in Human impact on the environment.

=== Niche construction and societal growth ===
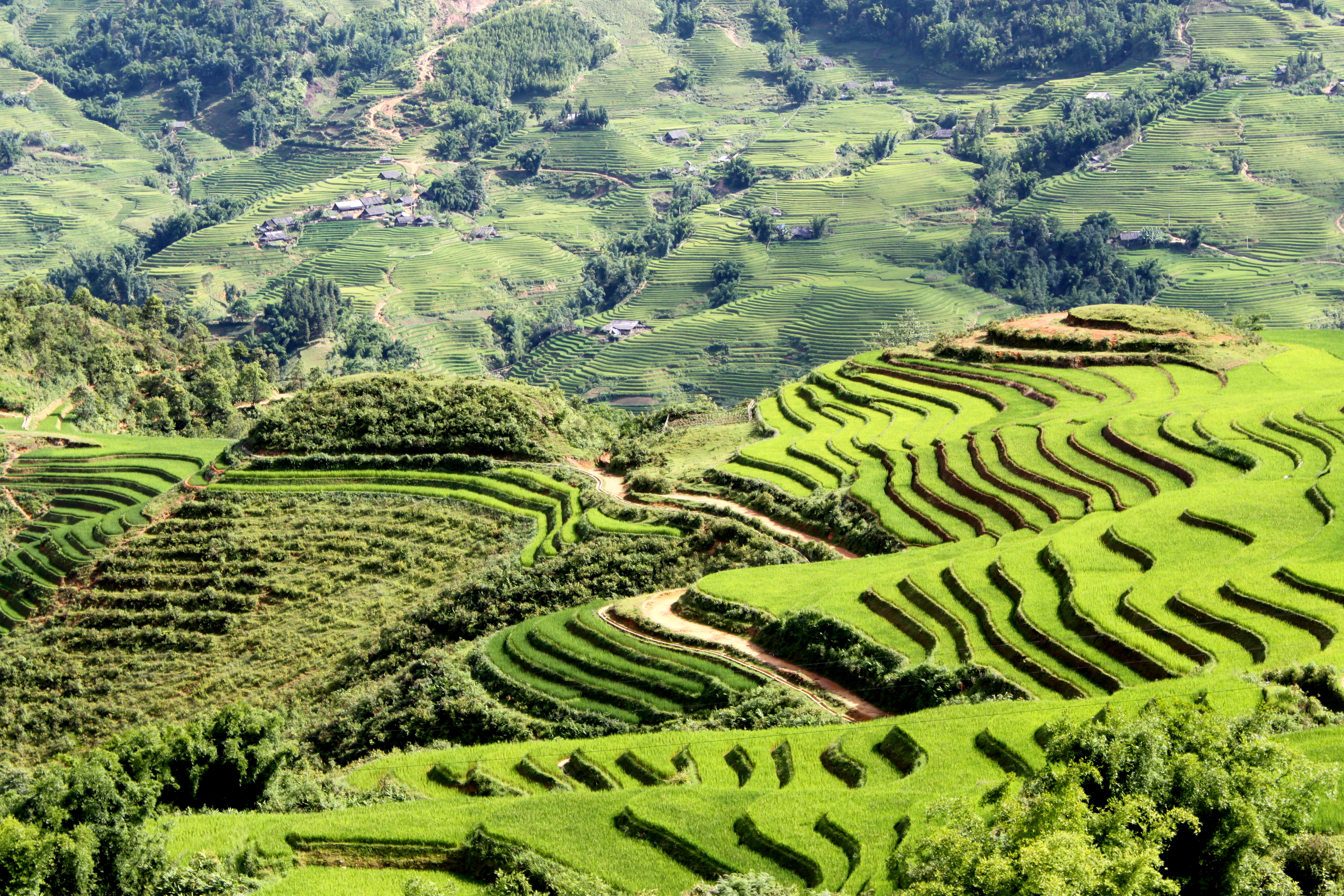
Building rice paddies (Oryza sativa) is an example of a prehistoric anthropogenic activity that can be classified as niche construction.

Anthropogenic activities can be regarded as niche construction or ecosystem engineering, processes by which a species modifies its environment to obtain ecological or cultural benefits. Humans are not the only species that perform significant modifications to their habitat: many species – including beavers, coral, earthworms, and elephants – also engineer ecosystems. The niche construction performed by prehistoric humans produced substantial societal benefits: it improved food supplies, reduced exposure to dangers, enabled trade, and created landscapes that supported denser human population centers. Some communities enriched soils, created new habitats, and propagated useful species.

When anthropogenic activities are perceived as contrary to nature conservation principles, they may be characterized as causing environmental damage or harm, or degrading an ecosystem. Research into prehistoric anthropogenic activities has generated debate regarding the applicability of modern concepts of nature conservation and sustainability to prehistoric and Indigenous cultures. Some scholars contend that such negative characterizations are unfounded because it is inappropriate to apply Western concepts of nature conservation to prehistoric peoples or subsistence cultures.

Characterizing an activity as niche construction or as damage to an ecosystem may depend on the scientific discipline of the observer: archaeologists and anthropologists tend to view habitat modifications as the natural process of niche construction, whereas conservation scientists and ecologists tend to view them as disturbances. According to the environmental scientist Erle Ellis:

Although land use has always sustained human societies, its ecological consequences are diverse and sometimes opposing, both degrading and enriching soils, shrinking wild habitats and shaping novel ones, causing extinctions of some species while propagating and domesticating others, and both emitting and absorbing the greenhouse gases that cause global climate change.

Many prehistoric societies practiced low-intensity forms of land use which maintained their ecosystem diversity for millennia. Domestication and cultivation of crops by prehistoric peoples often impacted the environment, but in some cases the selective breeding yielded important staple foods that were later disseminated globally, such as taro, yams and breadfruit (from Oceania and South Asia) and corn, potatoes, peanuts and tomatoes (from the New World). While anthropogenic activities enabled societies to grow and develop, they sometimes irreversibly altered the environment and – in some locations – contributed to major societal declines, for example at certain locations in North America, the Near East, and Central America.

== Types of impacts ==
As the population grew and humans developed new technologies, the relative proportion of different biomes changed drastically.

The prehistoric anthropogenic activities described above (hunting, farming, building, etc.) directly and indirectly impacted the environment. These anthropogenic (human-caused) alterations included:

- Vegetation modifications, including deforestation and alterations from anthropogenic fires
- Greenhouse gas emissions and climate change
- Landscape, soil, and geomorphological changes, including erosion
- Species alterations: translocation and domestication
- Reduced populations of animal species, including extinctions

Determining whether a prehistoric environmental change was anthropogenic can be difficult for several reasons: the magnitude of the modifications was typically small (relative to modern impacts); the timing and locations of alterations are often known only approximately; it is sometimes unclear if an environmental change was due to human activity or natural causes; and it is often difficult to identify human activities based on the available archaeological data.

=== Vegetation changes and deforestation ===
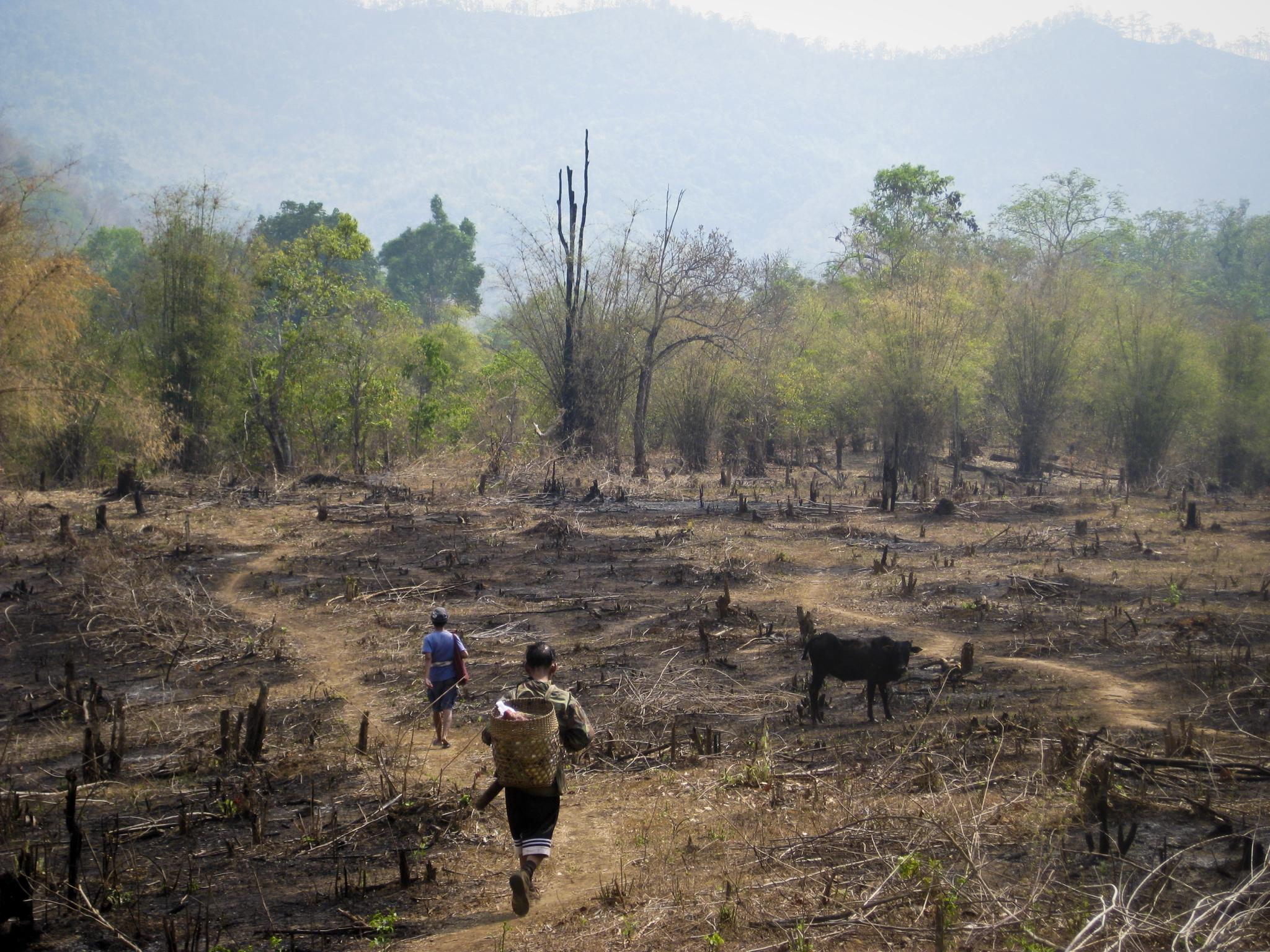
Prehistoric people used slash-and-burn practices to clear forests and vegetation for cropland.

One of the most consequential impacts of prehistoric human activity was deforestation. Techniques used for clearing forests included axes, animal grazing, fires, and slash-and-burn. As early as half a million years ago, fires may have been used by Homo erectus to clear vegetation.

Twelve thousand years ago, more than 90% of Earth's tropical forests and 95% of its temperate forests were inhabited and shaped by prehistoric peoples. Ten thousand years ago the world's forest cover was about 6 billion hectares. By 5,000 years ago (roughly in the middle of the First Agricultural Revolution), the coverage had been reduced by 170 million hectares. In 2023, it was 2 billion hectares below the 10 kya (thousand years ago) coverage.

Prehistoric impacts on vegetation and forests may have increased local biodiversity in some situations although some scholars contend that such increases may have been short-term or measured improperly. (Note: The anthropologist Raymond Hames wrote that "some historical ecologists [referring to William Balée] argue that although native peoples can be agents of environmental damage, their overall effect is to enhance the environment.... Such a claim is deeply problematic because it is based on the premise that enhancement is defined by increased biodiversity. Questions of how, why, and for whom increased biodiversity is beneficial are left unexamined. It is simply assumed to be an unalloyed good.")

=== Greenhouse gases and climate change ===
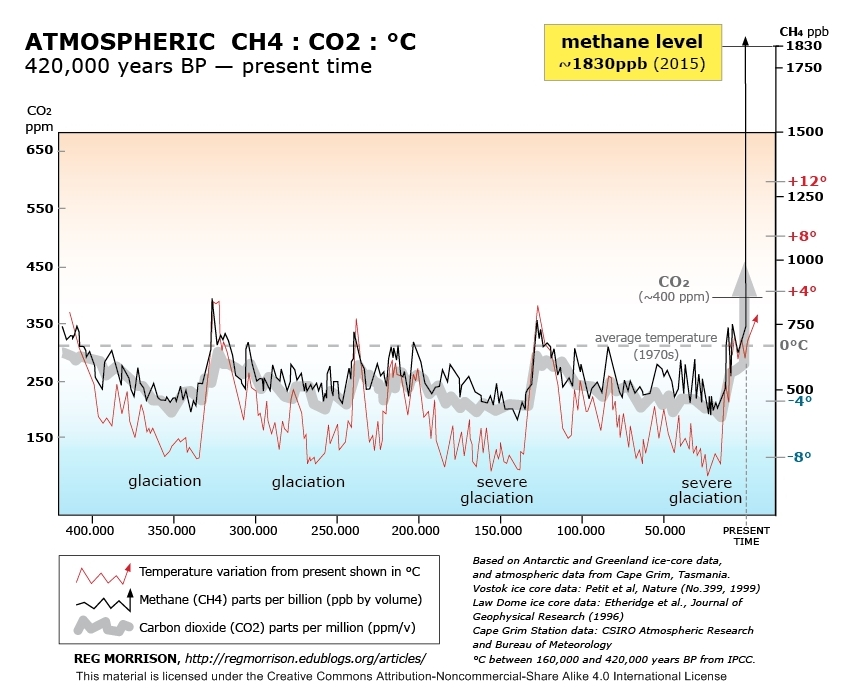
Greenhouse gases started increasing before the Industrial Age. Methane (thin dark line) started increasing around 5,000 years ago. Carbon dioxide (thick line) started increasing around 8,000 years ago.

When prehistoric humans began developing large-scale agricultural projects about 7,000 years ago, they cleared forests, which may have indirectly caused an increase in the amount of greenhouse gases (including carbon dioxide and methane) in the atmosphere. (Note: Methane increase starting 5,000 years ago may have been due to deforestation, agriculture, and domesticated livestock.) This may have been the start of humankind's contributions to the modern climate change crisis. Changes to the landscape can alter the climate through several mechanisms: the albedo of the Earth's surface, changes to atmospheric carbon dioxide levels, evapotranspiration, and topographic surface roughness. For example, clearing a tropical forest reduces evapotranspiration, which may reduce evaporative cooling and cloud cover. The development of technologies such as iron, metal axes, and plows accelerated the transformations.

Megafauna extinctions may have slightly increased global warming, but agriculture may have offset this by slightly decreasing it. Although there is extensive evidence for anthropogenic fires, their overall impact on the world's climate may have been small because the world population was relatively small when prehistoric fires were at their peak; additionally, there is evidence that most fires were non-anthropogenic.

=== Landscape, soil, and geomorphology alterations ===
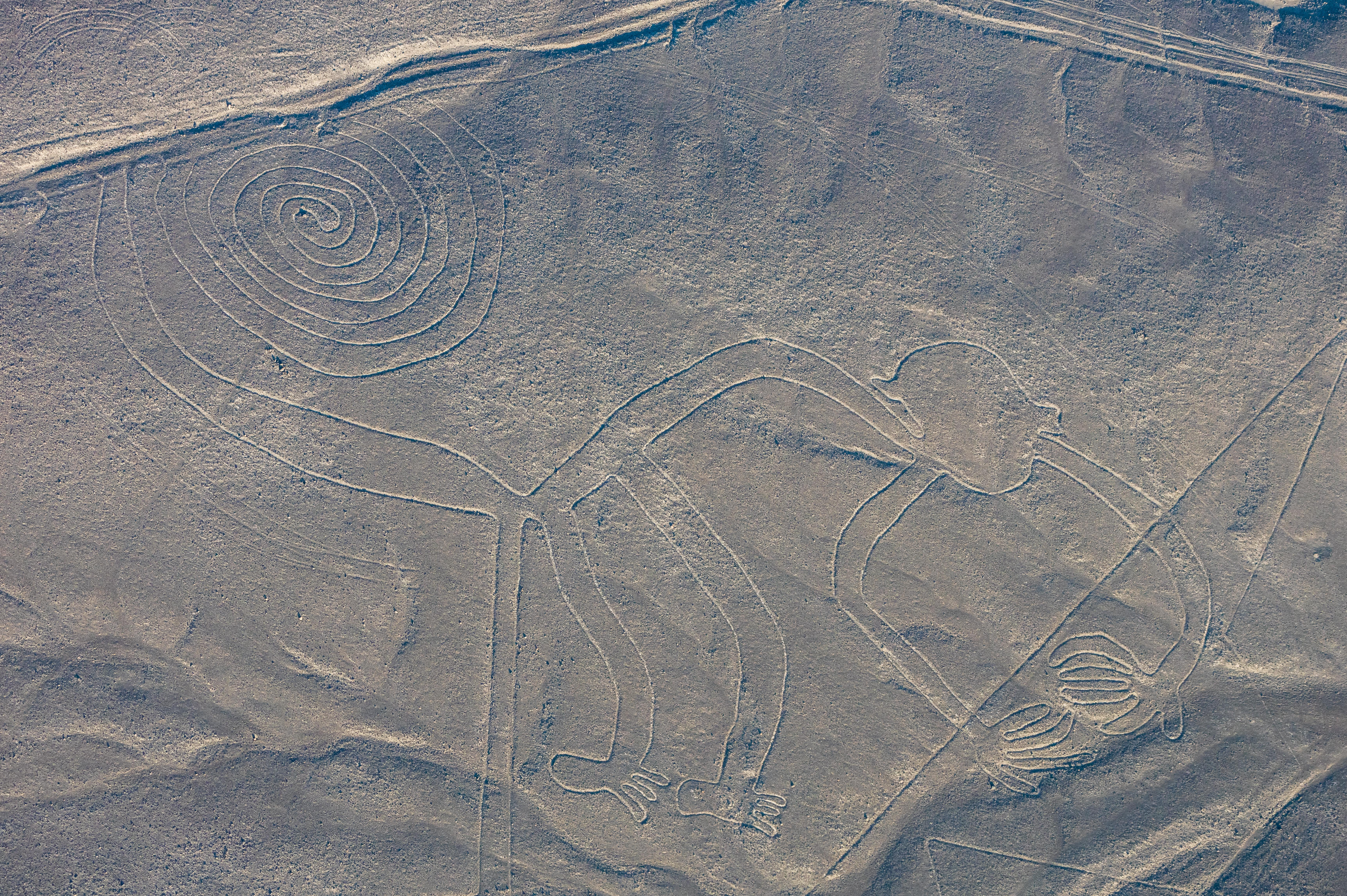
Prehistoric humans created large megaliths and geoglyphs, such as these Nazca lines in Peru.

Prehistoric peoples altered the geomorphology of the Earth's surface by modifying its natural landforms and landscapes. Even before the First Agricultural Revolution, human activities (such as clearing land with fire) contributed to soil erosion, which sometimes created alluvial fans downstream.

Alterations to landforms became more intensive with the advent of agriculture. The management of water was a driver for many transformations to the landscape, through the construction of canals, water wells, irrigation systems, dams, drainage ditches, and reservoirs. In some locations, the alterations were so extensive they left permanent traces in the landscape long after they were abandoned, as found in Mesopotamia, Hawaii, and India.

Soil quality was heavily transformed by prehistoric humans through processes such as erosion, nutrient depletion, increased salinity, and sediment accumulation in ponds and lakes. These transformations were significant around 3,000 years ago and accelerated 1,000 years ago.

Some prehistoric cultures built symbolic features such as geoglyphs (large geometric patterns on the ground) such as the Nazca lines in Peru and megaliths (large stone monuments) including Stonehenge in Britain. They also built earthworks, settlements, roads, and plowed furrows for crops.

=== Translocation and domestication of species ===
Humans introduced wild pigs (Sus scrofa) to many locations around the world, where they often impacted the environment.

Beginning in the Late Pleistocene, humans altered the distributions of various species around the globe, spanning most taxonomic groups. The variety of plants and other species that were introduced and cultivated was very broad, and included domesticated, wild, and pathogenic species. The archaeologist Patrick Vinton Kirch wrote: "...the variety of animals moved by human colonists is 'astonishing', including for example lice, beetles, fleas, mites, land snails, geckos, rats, mice, birds, deer, fox, and wolf. Although some translocations were purposeful, many others appear to have been inadvertent." In addition to moving species, humans deliberately altered species through domestication and selective breeding.

Humans changed the distribution of species at all scales: local, regional, and intercontinental. The archaeological record shows a generally accelerating trend – but the rate of change fluctuated. The archaeologists Nicole Boivin and Jon Erlandson identified four developments that played a major role in translocation of species. (Note: The four developments were not exhaustive, and did not include the most ancient human impacts; they were selected because they demonstrated important trends and patterns.) First was the migration of humans around the world, from about 195,000 to 12,000 years ago. Second was the development of agriculture and pastoralism, from roughly 11,700 to 1,000 years ago. Third was the colonization of islands (about 10,600 to 1,000 years ago). (Note: Included in the island-colonization phase was the early colonization of Cyprus around 10,600 years ago. Humans may have transported mammals to the Bismarck Archipelago 20,000 years ago.) The final development was urbanization and the creation of trade networks, from roughly 3,000 years ago to the modern era.

=== Extinction of animals ===
Map of early human migrations based on the Out of Africa theory. Numbers indicate when humans arrived at each location (thousands of years ago – kya).

Over the past 129,000 years many megafauna species around the world became extinct. These extinctions happened during the latter part of the Quaternary geological period – extending from about 129,000 years ago to the present. These late Quaternary extinctions are sometimes divided into two groups: those during the last ice age (called the Late Pleistocene extinctions – from 129,000 to 11,700 years ago), and those after that ice age ended (the Holocene extinctions – from 11,700 years ago to the present). (Note: Researchers use various starting dates for the late Quaternary extinctions, including: 132,000 years ago, 129,000 years ago, and 100,000 years ago.)

Although extinctions were common in the geological record going back many millions of years, the speed and magnitude of the extinctions since 129,000 years ago are unusual. The extinctions – though occurring in a brief time span when considered geologically – occurred at different times around the globe. The loss of hundreds of species of megafauna fundamentally altered the Earth's ecosystem.

Among these extinctions were over 350 mammal species, which reduced the global count of mammal species (of all sizes) to approximately 5,700 in 2020. More than half of the large land animal species alive 100,000 years ago became extinct. In the Americas, over 66 genera (over two-thirds) of large mammals became extinct. In North America alone, about 38 genera of large animals became extinct, including 19 genera of mammals. Some of the species that became extinct included saber-toothed tigers, terror birds, woolly mammoths, giant tortoises, (Note: Megalochelys was made extinct by Homo erectus, not Homo sapiens.) giant ground sloths, and huge armadillos – human activity was likely a driver in all of those extinctions.

==== Causes of extinctions ====
Natural climatic change is one of the factors that caused megafauna extinctions in the late Quaternary (from 129,000 years ago to present).

Researchers have explored the causes of the late Quaternary extinctions since the early 19th century. Since the late 20th century, the debate over the cause of the extinctions has been vigorous, focusing on the extent to which humans were responsible for the extinctions. Causes proposed for the extinctions include:

- Human causes – Over-hunting; (Note: The "overkill hypothesis" is the theory that human over-hunting was the primary cause of megafauna extinctions that occurred soon after humans first arrived on a landmass.) second-order predation (over-hunting a predator species impacts a prey species: population of prey increases, then crashes); habitat alterations or reductions; introduction of invasive species; anthropogenic fires (fires set by humans, deliberately or accidentally).
- Climatic causes – Including gradual climatic changes, as well as rapid variations.
- Infectious disease
- Impact of an extraterrestrial object
- Synergistic combination of multiple causes – For example, human activities (fire, hunting, agriculture, deforestation) contributing to climatic change.

Researchers consider the two primary causes to be natural climatic change and human activity. Many of the late Quaternary megafauna extinctions occurred after the arrival of humans, but finding evidence to prove a cause-and-effect relationship is difficult. The nature of the extinctions varied between species and locations.

==== Human activity as a factor ====
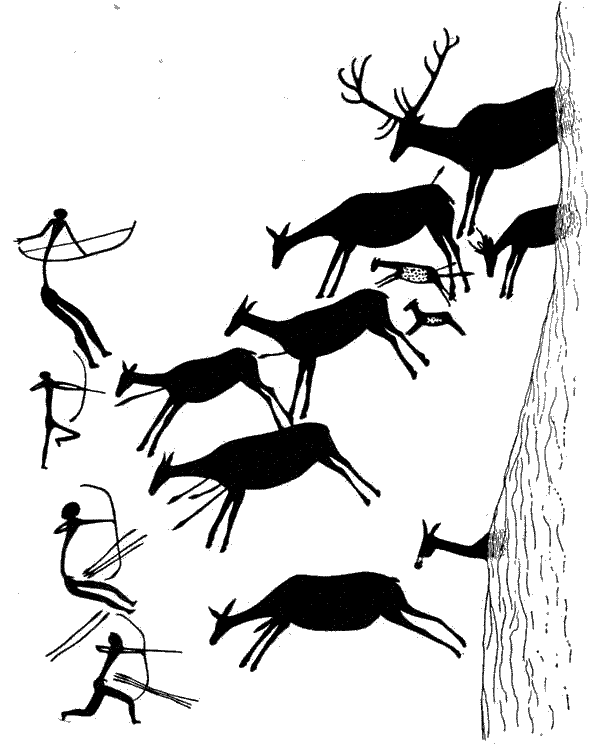
This cave art from Cave of the horses in Spain, created between 7000 and 4500 BCE, depicts humans hunting deer.

A large number of late Quaternary megafauna extinctions were a result of human activity. Evidence for human-related causes includes the timing of extinctions following human arrival, the lack of natural climatic changes at the time of extinctions, archaeological evidence of hunting and habitat destruction, geographic correlation of human presence and extinction events, and analysis of large fauna that did not go extinct. Humans were not responsible for all megafauna extinctions: a study of extinctions on islands found that while extinctions during the Holocene were often caused by humans, earlier Pleistocene extinctions often were not. Some scholars, as of 2020, argue that the extinctions in North America were primarily caused by natural climatic changes.

A 2024 review considered the debate over whether humans or natural climatic changes were responsible for late Quaternary large vertebrate extinctions. (Note: The 2024 review addressed extinctions that happened in the past 50,000 years. The author wrote: "The debate on the cause, or causes, of the late-Quaternary extinctions has been ongoing for over 200 years. Though most current work accepts at least a contributory role for modern humans, the topic remains controversial. We ... conclude the existing evidence strongly supports a dominant role of Homo sapiens and is inconsistent with climate as a substantial cause.") The study reported strong evidence that human activity was the cause of the extinctions, and only weak evidence for natural climatic changes. The study did not find strong support for climatic changes as a cause in either fine-scale space/time analysis, or in global analysis. The earliest extinctions were likely caused by hominins that predated Homo sapiens.

Some scientists consider human-driven extinctions to be the first major anthropogenic change to the ecosystem, and thus to mark the start of the Anthropocene. (Note: Scholars have multiple hypotheses of when the Anthropocene started. The proposal that it began 10,000 years ago, or more, when humans began extirpating large animals, is a relatively recent proposal.) Human activities that contribute to extinctions include hunting, habitat destruction (including anthropogenic fire), and the introduction of invasive species (such as rats, pigs, dogs, and possibly chickens), but it is unlikely that small-scale societies caused extinctions by hunting alone.

==== Human arrival dates ====
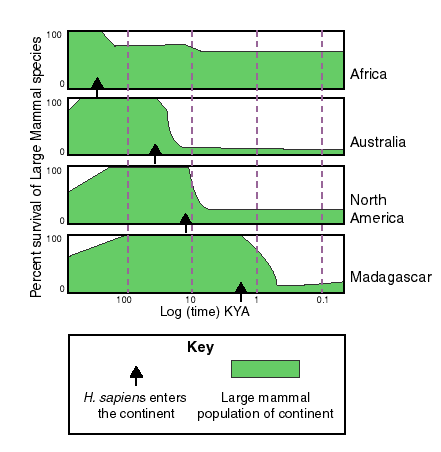
The percentage of megafauna on different land masses over time, with the arrival of humans indicated.

One of the difficulties in determining causes of extinctions is ascertaining when humans arrived in specific locations on Earth. A technique to estimate arrival time is to measure proxy data that are correlated with human arrival. Proxy data include pollen counts, traces of small vertebrates (such as rats), an increase in charcoal particles, and a decrease in dung-fungus spores. A 2005 study estimated human arrival dates in several locations and identified a common pattern of collapsing animal populations after human arrival. An argument against natural climatic change as a cause is the fact that extinctions around the world happened at various times, whereas a global climatic change would tend to produce extinctions at roughly the same time.

The primary driver of many extinctions was the arrival of humans, but natural climatic change also played a role. One study determined that the impacts of climatic change were not rapid: the changes could take several thousand years to affect a species. The study used a model that performed well (corresponded with known data based on archaeological records) in most of the world, including North and South America, Europe, Australia, Japan, Madagascar, Tasmania, and New Zealand. The model's predictions did not perform well in Africa and Asia.

==== Types of animals ====
Larger mammals became extinct to a much larger degree than smaller mammals in the late Quaternary. Vertical axis is percentage of species that became extinct. (Note: Values represent number of species in late Quaternary (129,000 years ago to present).)

The majority of mammal extinctions between 50,000 and 10,000 years ago were relatively large or slow-breeding. This preference for large, slow-breeding mammals was not seen in extinctions that happened earlier in the Cenozoic era. This observation, coupled with the fact that the extinctions happened roughly at the same time that humans spread around the globe, suggests that human activity, particularly hunting, was a contributing factor. Natural climatic changes likely played a role in the extinctions: even if precipitated by human activities, climatic change may have influenced the timing, location, or magnitude of the defaunation. Climatic change may have combined synergistically with human activities (hunting, habitat loss, anthropogenic fires) to increase the magnitude of the extinctions.

==== Other evidence ====
129,000 years ago, the largest land animals weighed about 20,000 kg. Then humans began to spread around the world, and most large species became extinct by 1000 CE. The largest land animals today are around 5,000 kg.
Large mammals that did not go extinct during the late Pleistocene experienced significant population declines. Each light step-line represents one species. Vertical axis is an estimate of the species' population. (Note: Vertical axis is the effective population size, which is a population estimate based on genetic drift.)

Scientists used computer models to analyze how extinction rates evolved since the Late Pleistocene. The models showed that natural climatic change was not a likely factor, because random changes to model conditions produced similar results to conditions that varied climate data. Conversely, the model showed that human impacts were strongly correlated with the extinctions. The scientists concluded that humans caused many extinctions that followed their arrival on new landmasses. The models also predicted that continuing human development in the 21st century would cause a new wave of mammal extinctions to begin around 2100 CE in all regions of the world.

Late Quaternary megafauna extinctions occurred on all continents except Antarctica. The proportion of large species that went extinct was markedly lower in Eurasia and Africa (where many large mammals survived into the 21st century). Researchers analyzed the geographic distribution of extinction events and determined that extinctions were closely correlated with the geographical locations of human expansion, and weakly correlated with the severity of climatic changes. The implication of human causation was especially strong in locations where Homo sapiens were the first hominins to arrive. The study found significant discrepancies between the locations of natural climatic changes and the locations of extinctions.

To answer the question of what caused the megafauna extinctions, scientists analyzed the megafauna species that did not go extinct. The study found that 91% of the species suffered a decline in population, with larger-sized species experiencing larger declines. The population declines were found on all landmasses on Earth, which is consistent with a cause related to human activities (rather than climatic change). Human-related causes of the population declines were also implicated by the fact that the declines were most pronounced in particular temporal periods when humans were expanding into new regions (which would be unlikely if the cause was climatic change).

== Cascading impacts ==
An environmental change can sometimes produce a cascade of indirect effects. The extinction of a large herbivorous species can increase the amount of vegetation, alter the region's fire regime, decrease the amount of dung (which in turn impacts biotic microhabitats), or create an empty ecological niche that other species can fill. An analysis of extinctions occurring after 1500 CE found that they can lead to changes in water quality, pollination, decomposition, pest control, and nutrient cycling. Deforestation caused by humans can increase erosion, impact soil nutrients, and reduce the number of large animals. Human predation on one species may indirectly cause other species to become extinct.

== Regional impacts ==
Prehistoric societies have shaped ecosystems for tens of thousands of years on every landmass they occupied. The following examples of environmental modifications illustrate how the impacts varied regionally. (Note: It is not practical to enumerate every individual impact made throughout prehistory. These examples of regional impacts are a selection of prehistoric impacts documented in academic literature and are not intended to be exhaustive.)

=== Eurasia ===
==== Megafauna ====
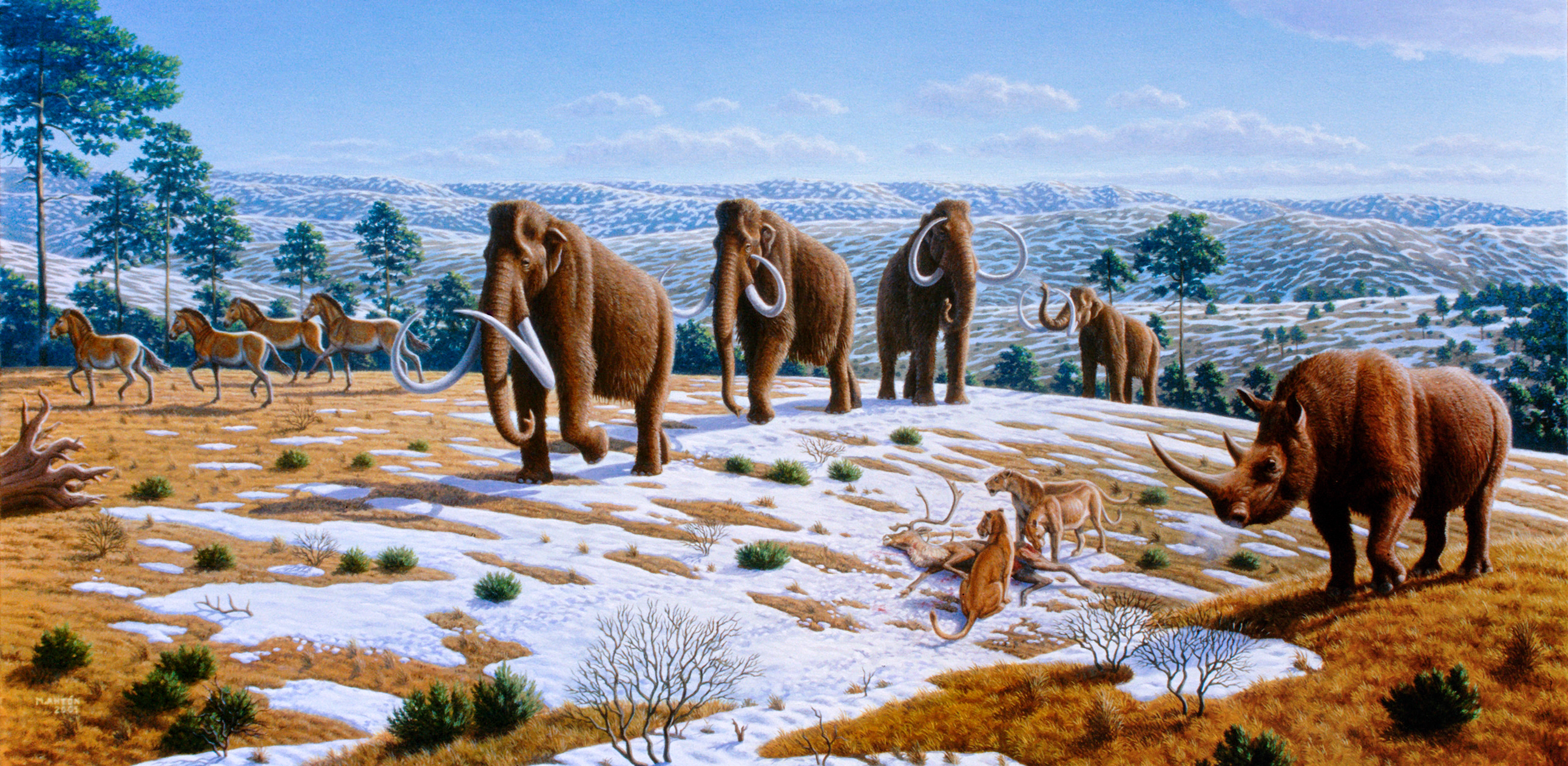
Artist's rendering of mammoths (left) and a woolly rhino (right) in Eurasia.

Megafauna in Eurasia – such as mammoths, woolly rhinos, and giant deer – lived contemporaneously with humans for 30,000 years. This is in contrast to Australia, North America, and Pacific islands, where many megafauna and flightless birds rapidly became extinct after human arrival. Many megafauna species in Eurasia were eventually extirpated due to human hunting in combination with pressures from natural climatic change. Between 50 and 10 kya, nine genera (35% of the total) of large mammals became extinct, which is less than in most other continents.

Eurasia is unique among the world's landmasses, because it is the only one that has a significant correlation between natural climatic change and megafauna extinctions. That fact, coupled with the paucity of direct archaeological evidence of hunting megafauna in Eurasia, has led some researchers to question if hunting played a role in the extinctions. Other scientists suggest that the lack of direct evidence is likely due to the fact that humans did not live in the same regions of Eurasia as the megafauna for most of the 30,000 years: in some cases, humans lived primarily in the temperate regions, whereas the megafauna lived farther north. When humans migrated into regions occupied by the megafauna, extinctions followed.

The Woolly rhinoceros became extinct in Eurasia around 9,800 years ago. A 2024 study of the causes of the extinction determined that a synergistic combination of natural climatic change (leading to fragmentation and reduction of habitat) and human hunting (low-level, but sustained) caused the extinction, with climatic change as the dominant cause.

==== Near East and the Levant ====
Prehistoric humans planted olive trees in the Levant, often displacing other vegetation.

Humans in the Near East began living in settlements 12,000 years ago and started cultivating crops 10,000 years ago. Farming altered the landscape – which was vulnerable to erosion – and converted parts of it to xeric vegetation. Humans began grazing domesticated sheep (Ovis aries) and goats (Capra hircus) 6,000 years ago. Farming and grazing caused more changes to the vegetation, favoring plants that thrive in disturbed ground. About 6,000 BCE, many villages in the Levant (lands around the Eastern Mediterranean) were abandoned due to deforestation and other anthropogenic impacts. The secondary products revolution took place in the Levant from 4,000 to 2,000 BCE, marked by the use of traction animals to cultivate and transport agricultural products to marketplaces. Creation of orchard crops – such as figs, grapes, and olives – led to a reduction in forest coverage. These anthropogenic forces, coupled with natural climatic changes, significantly altered the vegetation and landscape.

Many species of megafauna in the Levant became locally extinct over the period from 1.5 million years ago to 10,500 years ago: during that time span, the mean body mass declined by a factor of about 60. The body size of hunted animals declined at a linear rate over that time, and was not correlated with climatic changes. Researchers hypothesize that humans hunted megafauna until they were extirpated, then shifted to the next-largest prey, and repeated that cycle. Humans developed new technologies to successfully hunt smaller prey. A 2022 study concluded that the extinction of many species in the Southern Levant was due to human hunting, rather than climatic change.

==== Europe ====
Evidence of widespread anthropogenic fire used by hunter-gatherers at the Last Glacial Maximum is indicated by models without (left) and with (right) anthropogenic fire. The right image more closely matches historical pollen data.

Before the start of the Holocene, hunter-gatherers (including Neanderthals) in Europe used fire to clear vegetation. During the last ice age – when ice sheets covered much of Europe – there was not much forest cover, but forests began to expand after the ice retreated. Before agriculture began in Europe, forest cover in the continent reached its maximum, occurring 8,000 years ago in northern Europe and 6,000 years ago in mid-latitude Europe. The northern forest cover declined from 8,000 to 6,000 years ago, then remained relatively constant until 1,700 years ago, when it began to decrease steadily due to human impacts. Mid-latitude forests began to diminish after 6,000 years ago, about the time that agriculture was introduced (which generally required cleared land to grow crops). This was not uniform across the continent: initially, Britain saw a decline in forest cover, but southern Germany saw a conversion to secondary forest without an overall decline. The mid-latitude forest decline continued until 1,700 years ago, when it paused during the Migration Period following the fall of the Roman Empire.

==== China ====
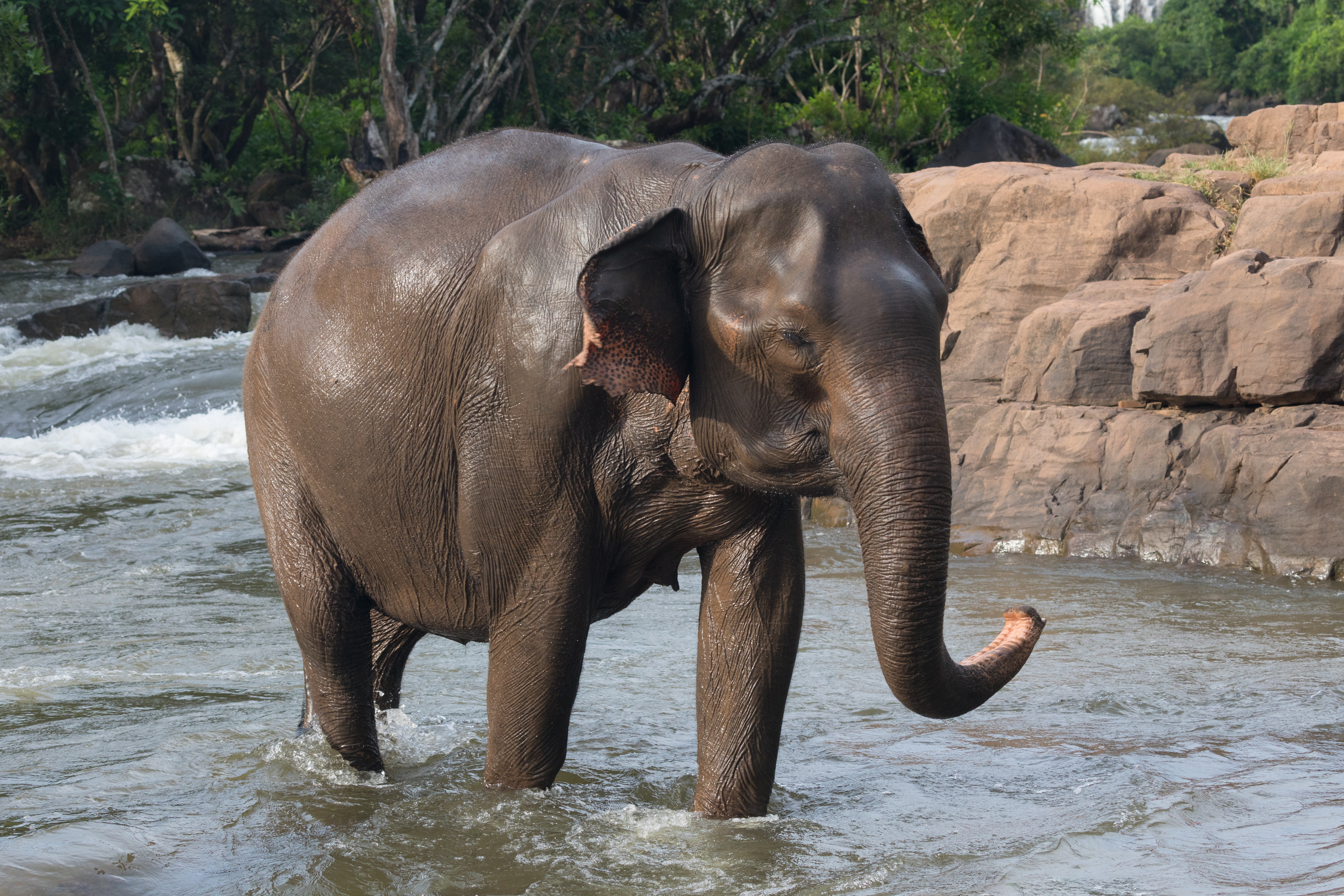
The range of Asian elephants once covered most of China, but by 1,000 BCE human-caused deforestation reduced the range in China to south of the Huai River. (Note: In the 21st century, the range of elephants is a small region near the border with Laos. This photograph is of an elephant in Laos.)

The history of prehistoric environmental alterations in China is complex, as the impacts were due to a combination of natural processes (such as climatic change) and human activities. Humans began to impact their environment in China around 10,000 years ago, when societies transitioned from hunter-gathering to agriculture. (Note: Rice cultivation in China began about 8,000 to 7,000 BCE.) Anthropogenic forest-clearing began around 6,000 BCE, and increased in intensity by 1500 BCE. Human-caused deforestation eliminated the habitat of the Asian elephant: its range once covered nearly all of China, but by 1000 BCE, it had been pushed south of the Huai River. (Note: In the early 21st century, the only remaining wild elephants in China were several hundred in the far south of the country, near the borders with Laos and Vietnam.) Between 4,000 and 2,200 years ago, interactions with other Eurasian cultures introduced new technologies that changed the nature of human impacts, partially due to new occupations such as copper smelting. In this period, humans expanded their range and began to colonize higher-altitude regions.

=== Africa ===
Major vegetation changes followed the migration of Bantu peoples through central Africa. "ya" = years ago.

Around 2 million years ago, hominins in Africa evolved to occupy the carnivore ecological niche. Since that time, the ecological diversity of other carnivores in Africa has significantly diminished, leading some scientists to speculate that hominins were partially responsible for the loss of diversity. (Note: Some scientists, including Lars Werdelin, speculate that hominins may have begun impacting their environment through hunting as long as 2 million years ago: "... this period also includes the earliest evidence for persistent carnivory among hominins at ∼2 Mya.... carnivorans only saw minimal turnover until the latter part of that period, leading [the scientists] to suggest that the guild’s loss of functional richness and evenness is likely explained by the evolution of hominins into carnivore niche space.") The late Quaternary extinctions were not as acute in Africa as on other continents, possibly because of the very lengthy and gradual co-evolution of large fauna and hominins. Still, 10 genera and 24 species of megafauna became extinct. Humans were the most likely drivers of these extinctions, based on their timing in relation to natural climatic and human behavioral changes. Starting in the mid-Holocene, pastoralism and agriculture expanded throughout the continent.

Between 3,000 and 2,000 years ago, large parts of the rainforest in Central Africa became deforested and abruptly changed to savanna. These changes took place in the modern nations of Gabon, Cameroon, the Democratic Republic of the Congo, and the Republic of the Congo. Both natural climatic change and human activity have been proposed as explanations for this transition. The deforestation coincided with the large-scale movement of Bantu-speaking farmers from their original homelands in modern Nigeria and Cameroon, who moved south and east through much of Central Africa. The Bantu-speaking peoples required land for crops and practiced iron smelting, leading some scientists to conclude that human activity was likely a significant factor in deforestation.

In contrast with many Polynesian islands, where Holocene extinctions rapidly followed the arrival of humans, the extinction process on the island of Madagascar was more gradual. After humans arrived around 2,000 BCE, they lived alongside some large animals for hundreds and even thousands of years: some extinctions did not happen until about 1,500 CE. Ultimately, about 45 species of vertebrates (including all large terrestrial animals) became extinct. The precise causes of the extinctions are not certain, but hunting and anthropogenic fires (Note: Anthropogenic fires are fires set by humans, deliberately or accidentally.) appear to have played a significant role.

=== Americas ===
==== North America ====
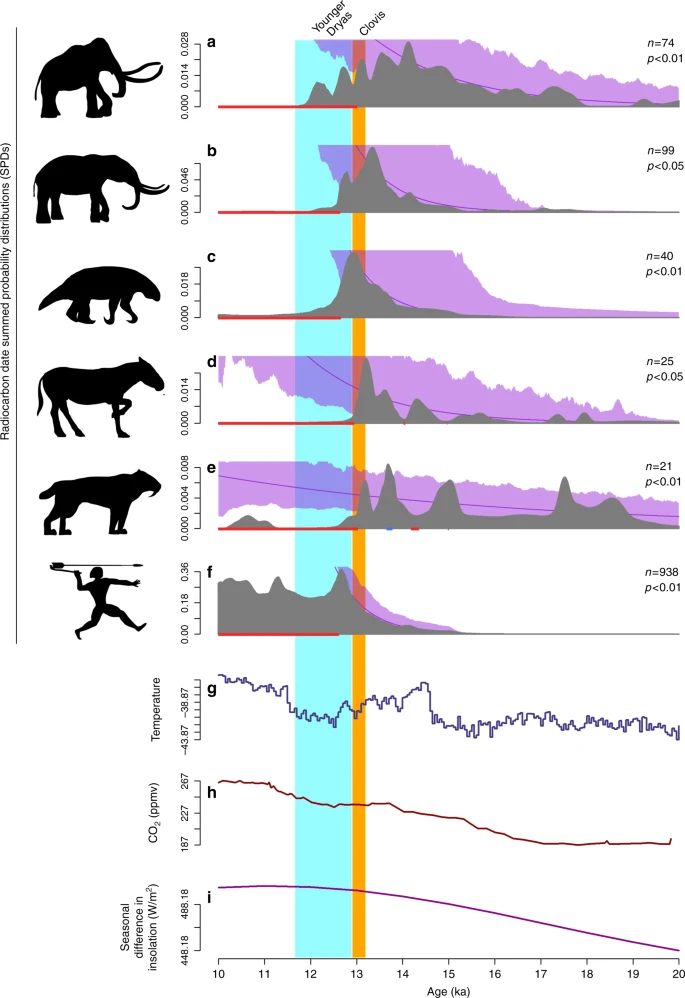
Timeline showing decline of megafauna in relation to human arrival in the contiguous United States. Time flows from right to left. The dark gray region of each species shows the estimated population of the species. The thin curved line of each species is the estimated exponential growth (if left undisturbed). (Note: Animals from top to bottom: (a) mammoth, (b) mastodon, (c) Shasta ground sloth, (d) horse, (e) saber-toothed cat, and (f) human. The two long vertical bars that extend through all species show the duration of (a) Clovis culture (right bar); and (b) Younger Dryas climate event (left bar).)

Humans arrived in North America from Asia about 13,500 years ago and migrated southward into South America. Measurements of the extinction dates of megafauna in the Americas found that the extinctions chronologically proceeded from north to south, corresponding to the migration of humans, suggesting that human activity played a role in the extinctions. After the arrival of humans in North America in the Late Pleistocene, more than half of the large mammal species became extinct including 34 genera and two complete orders. Martin proposed in the 1970s that many of the extinctions were due to human hunting. Whether the extinctions were due to human hunting or other factors (such as natural climatic change) continued to be subject of scientific research and debate in the early 21st century.

A search for direct archaeological evidence of humans hunting Pleistocene mammals found evidence of hunting in only 5 of 37 genera, leading some researchers to conclude that human hunting may not be a cause of Pleistocene extinctions of mammals in North America. Other researchers contend that "absence of evidence for kill sites is not evidence of absence", arguing that the archaeological record is very sparse, and a paucity of direct evidence is not proof that hunting did not occur. (Note: Prates 2021 wrote: "... recognizing that humans played a principal role in the extinction process requires neither high archeological visibility of hunting nor massive predation on all the extinct species. Large mammal populations were already adaptively vulnerable because of climatic and environmental changes .... Relatively moderate or even low levels of human predation on a few species could have strongly impacted trophic networks.") Computer modeling confirmed that human hunting, alone, could account for the North American mammal extinctions. (Note: Some researchers questioned the utility of using computer models to analyze the causes of extinctions.)

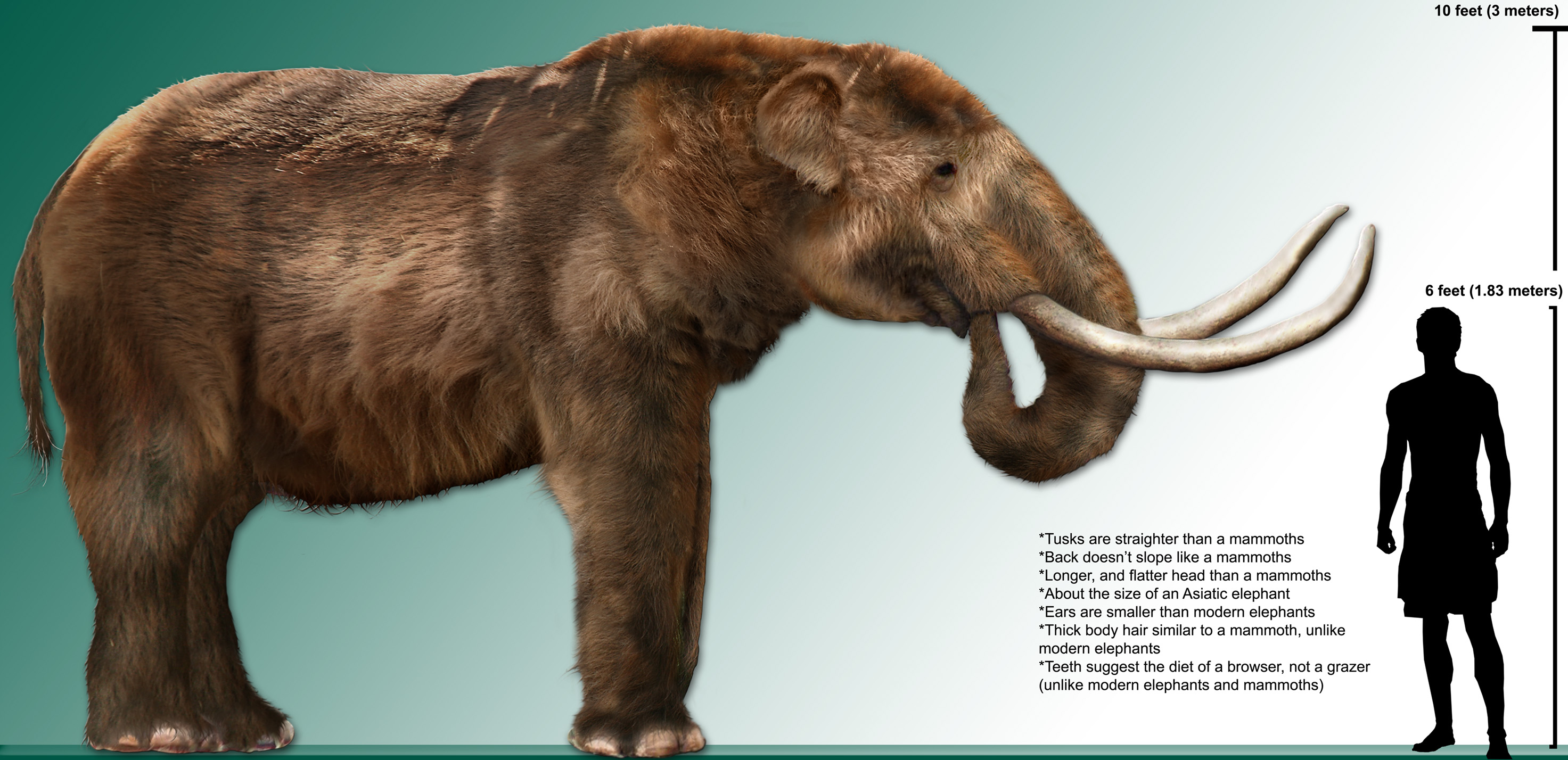
The American mastodon was one of the large mammals that became extinct in North America about the time that humans arrived.

The Clovis culture consisted of peoples living in North America around 12,800 years ago. Scientists have theorized that the Clovis hunted megafauna. An analysis of the isotopes found within the only known Clovis skeletal remains suggested that mammoth was the largest contributor to Clovis diet, supplemented with bison and elk. (Note: The diet was comparable to the diet of now-extinct saber-toothed cats.)

Megafauna extinctions in Southern California were partially caused by human activity (fires and hunting), but those actions were exacerbated by an increasingly arid climate. Indigenous peoples living in the boreal forests of North America used controlled fires to manage their habitat. The purposes of the fires included controlling undergrowth vegetation, improving hunting success, and clearing campsites.

The Ancestral Pueblo peoples in southwest North America abandoned their homelands in the 13th century, about the same time that the surrounding areas became deforested. Some scholars hypothesize that the deforestation was due to over-harvesting by the community, which – along with other factors such as drought – led to a societal collapse. Other researchers contend that there is no proof that the Pueblo people were responsible for the deforestation or that it contributed to the abandonment of their population centers around Mesa Verde and Chaco Canyon.

==== Central America ====
Archaeologists have studied lake basins in central Mexico for evidence of human impacts on the environment. The sedimentary layers below the lakes provide a chronological record of erosion, climate, pollen, diatoms, magnetism, and – indirectly – human activity. Lake Pátzcuaro in modern Mexico – the home of the Tarascan civilization – provides evidence of three waves of extensive anthropogenic landscape modifications around its shores. The first wave was around 3,000 years ago, when maize was first cultivated; the second around 2,000 years ago when agricultural activities intensified; and a third about 900 years ago when the Purépecha people arrived. In all these episodes, agricultural activity led to land-clearing, which caused deforestation and erosion. The magnitude of erosion during those periods was comparable to the erosion seen when Europeans arrived and introduced the plow. (Note: The Maya civilization was a pre-Columbian society in Central America. Although not a prehistoric culture (because they had a writing system), from 2000 BCE to 1000 CE they altered their environment with waterworks (dams, reservoirs, and canals), urban infrastructure (temples, buildings, and roads), slash-and-burn fires to clear forest, and the establishment of terraces, fields, and orchards for agriculture. Many academic works that discuss prehistoric impacts to the environment also discuss the Maya civilization.) Pre-Columbian agricultural practices in some semi-arid upland hillsides (located in modern Mexico) caused heavy erosion – that would take hundreds or thousands of years to recover from – leading to abandonment.

==== South America ====
Fishtail projectile points, such as these from Argentina, were used for hunting.

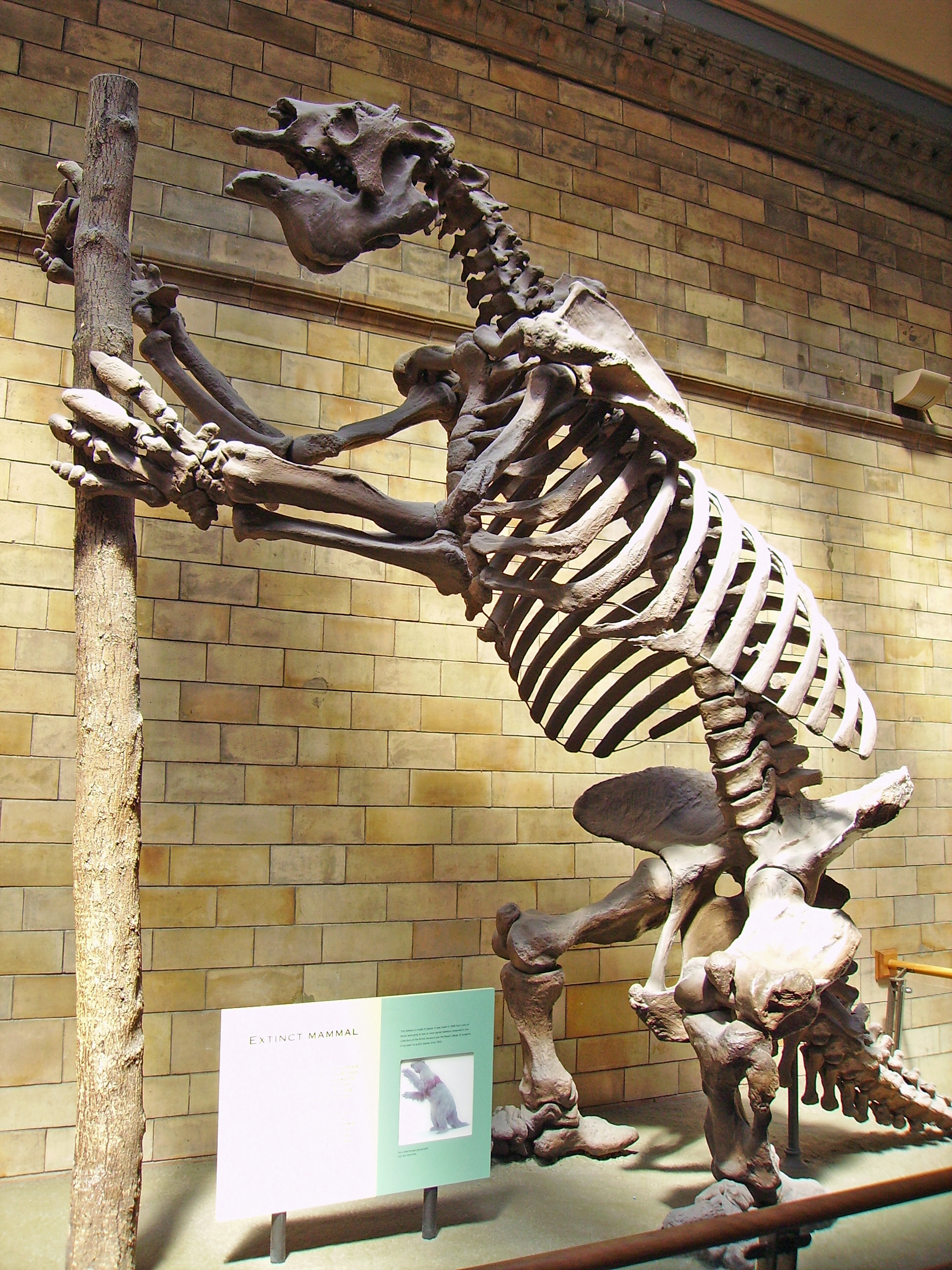
Skeleton of a Megatherium, an extinct genus of giant sloths that lived in South America.

South America – like most of the world (Note: Except Antarctica. The extinctions in Africa were less acute than other continents.) – experienced Late Pleistocene extinctions, but they were more severe on this continent: over 80% of megafauna species became extinct, spanning 50 genera and extinguishing three complete orders. As with many Late Pleistocene extinctions, both human activities and climate change were considered as potential causes. The distribution of Fishtail projectile points (often used as weapons) on the continent demonstrated that humans were the primary drivers of megafauna extinctions. That result was based on a strong correlation – in both time and space – between megafauna remains and the weapons.

===== Amazonia =====
Although Amazonia is sometimes viewed in the popular imagination as an untouched wilderness, many parts were heavily impacted by pre-Columbian human settlement. The first humans to settle in Amazonia arrived around 13,000 years ago. These pre-Columbian cultures extensively modified the environment, and cleared forests to make room for villages and crops. They did not have iron tools and used fire to make clearings for structures and agriculture, the remains of which are often visible in the modern era as Amazonian dark earth or terra preta. They also may have contributed to the extinction of some South American megafauna. They introduced crops brought from Mesoamerica and they abandoned fields which turned into secondary forests that were different from the original forests.

When Europeans first visited the Amazon, many believed it was an untouched, old growth forest and were not aware that much of it was secondary forest due to habitat alterations by Indigenous peoples.

After the arrival of Europeans in Amazonia, the population of Indigenous peoples there diminished, and during the 18th century, many regions were abandoned and agricultural areas were reclaimed by new sorts of biodiversity. In the early 19th century, European scientists – such as Henry Walter Bates and Alfred Russel Wallace – visited Amazonia and erroneously concluded that the secondary forests were in their original, pre-human condition. As late as 2010, some scientists continued to be surprised to find evidence of significant human impacts in certain remote parts of the Amazon basin. (Note: In 2008, some biodiversity scientists studying the Caxiuana National Forest were surprised to discover extensive evidence of environmental alterations caused by ancient human cultures.)

In the cloud forests of Ecuador, before the arrival of Europeans, prehistoric cultures deforested large amounts of their environment for their own uses. The intensive management and cultivation of the cleared landscapes continued until arrival of the Europeans caused the Indigenous population to dramatically decrease, (Note: The population decrease was due to disease, uprisings, and brutal treatment by the Europeans.) leading to a cessation of deforestation around 1588 CE. During the next 130 years, a secondary forest grew in the formerly cultivated areas, creating a dense forest that Europeans incorrectly assumed was a pristine wilderness. The deforestation performed by the Indigenous peoples was more extensive than the post-1950 deforestation performed by descendants of European colonizers.

Some scholars contend that the impacts of early human inhabitants of Amazonia were sustainable and even benefited the environment by increasing biodiversity. Although pre-Columbian humans made extensive alterations to the environment, the magnitude was generally far less than that of late 20th-century large-scale agricultural practices. The agricultural traditions of the prehistoric peoples may offer examples of less-intensive practices that can be used in the modern era to minimize damage to the Amazonian environment.

=== Oceania ===
The number of bird species that were exterminated on Pacific islands after the arrival of Indigenous peoples was roughly 2,000 – most of them flightless. This was about 20% of the total number of bird species on Earth. When including species that were extirpated (made locally extinct) on Pacific islands, the total is roughly 8,000 populations.

==== Australia ====
Diprotodon (left) and Genyornis newtoni (right) are two large animals that became extinct in Australia at roughly the same time humans arrived, but the cause of the extinctions is uncertain.

Australia experienced a tremendous loss of biodiversity in the late Quaternary: all animals (birds, reptiles, and mammals) weighing more than 100 kg became extinct. Of animals weighing more than 45 kg, 23 of 24 genera went extinct. Extinction also claimed all six genera of large reptiles, a giant flightless bird, three marsupial families, and two guilds.

Proposed drivers of the extinctions are natural climatic change (in particular, gradual aridification) and human activity (hunting and anthropogenic fire). Debate about whether the extinctions in Australia were caused by humans or climatic change (or both) has continued for more than a century. (Note: Causes debated since 1884.) The debate continued into the 21st century partly because of temporal uncertainties about the arrival of humans and the extinctions. (Note: Scholars who assert human causation of extinction in Australia include Bergman 2023, Turney 2008, Miller 2005, and Roberts 2001. Scholars who emphasize climatic change causes (or question human causation) include Archer 2025, Brook 2002, and Wroe 2006.) An example of data uncertainty is the human arrival date: one researcher put it at between 60 and 52 thousand years ago (kya), another at 50 to 43 kya, another at 65 kya, and another at between 55 and 45 kya.

Both North America and Australia experienced a large number of extinctions, but it has been far harder to draw conclusions about Australian events because of uncertainty about arrival dates and lack of solid evidence of hunting. Some researchers have determined that most of the Australian extinctions occurred after or contemporaneously with the arrival of humans but others have suggested the opposite. A 2006 study determined that human activity was likely not the sole driver of the megafauna extinctions, based on the gradual aridification of the continent and evidence that most of Australia's extinct megafauna became extinct long before humans arrived.

An example of the confusion surrounding the data for extinctions is a short-faced kangaroo tibia that had scratch marks. Some researchers concluded that they were evidence of butchering by humans, but later analysis determined that the marks were made long after the animal's death, after the bone had fossilized, and hence are not proof of hunting.

One of the few extinct Australian species for which direct evidence of human predation has been found is the large, flightless bird Genyornis newtoni. Scientists analyzed fragments of its eggshells (up to 140,000 years old) and concluded that humans may have caused the Genyornis newtoni extinction due to predation on its eggs. Scientists also analyzed fragments of eggshells from the extinct large bird Dromaius novaehollandiae and found a permanent reduction in the variety of its food sources beginning about the time that humans arrived. The researchers hypothesized that fires set by humans were the most plausible cause of the extinctions, because the isotope record showed that – soon after human arrival – the available vegetation mixture changed from one adapted to drought to a mixture adapted to fire.

Data from the island of Tasmania is consistent with a chronology where the extinctions followed soon after the arrival of humans. The arrival of humans on Tasmania occurred between 43 and 40 kya. Analysis of fossils shows that some Tasmanian megafauna survived until 41 kya, and so there was overlap between the presence of humans and megafauna on Tasmania. In addition, the historical vegetation data of Tasmania does not show any significant natural climatic changes between 43 and 37 kya, indicating that humans are a plausible cause of the extinctions.

==== New Zealand ====
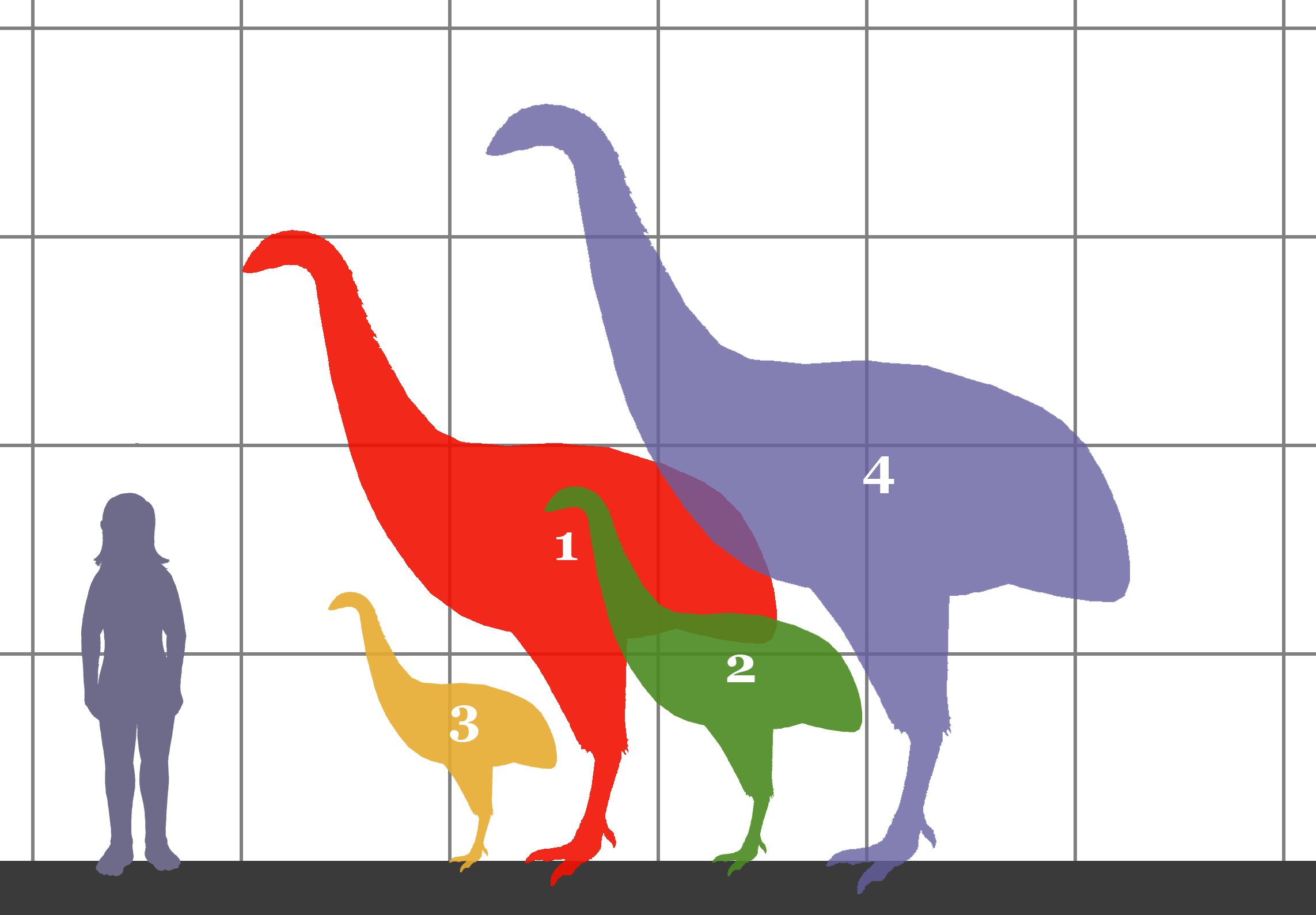
The Māori people of New Zealand extirpated all species of moa (large, flightless birds) on the islands. (Note: 1. Dinornis novaezealandiae; 2. Emeus crassus; 3. Anomalopteryx didiformis; 4. Dinornis robustus)

New Zealand provides unique insights into human impacts because it was the last major landmass colonized by humans, had a diverse set of bird species, and experienced the most rapid human-caused megafauna extinction event. Before the arrival of Polynesians in the 13th century, New Zealand was home to several species of moa (Dinornithiformes) – large, flightless birds. All 11 species of moa were extirpated – as well as 23 other bird species, 3 frog species, and 1 reptile species – following the arrival of humans. The extinction of the moa was the most rapid human-facilitated megafauna extinction and one of the final prehistoric megafauna extinctions of the Holocene.

In the mid-20th century, natural climatic change was considered to be a plausible explanation for the New Zealand extinctions but it was eliminated as a possible cause in the latter part of the 20th century. A scientific analysis of moa fossils and habitats indicated that their populations were stable and large prior to the arrival of humans, and there was no evidence of a gradual decline in population, as might be caused by climatic change. It is now widely accepted that Polynesians caused the extinction through hunting and habitat destruction. (Note: A 2025 study investigated whether the extinction of the moa was inevitable. Models showed that the moa would become extinct even under low rates of hunting. The only scenarios in which moa survived are those where more than 50% of New Zealand's land was protected from hunting.)

When Polynesians arrived, the moa population of New Zealand was estimated to be about 9,200 individuals. Archaeological evidence shows that humans hunted the moa. The moa were extirpated within 100 to 200 years after humans arrived. At the time the Polynesians extirpated the moa on the South Island, the total human population of New Zealand was less than 2,000. The human population density at the time of the extinction was very sparse: at most 0.01 humans per km^{2}. Evidence of moa butchery is found in over 100 sites on New Zealand's South Island. Evidence is rarer on the North Island, perhaps because the higher density of Polynesians in the north caused the extinction to proceed rapidly, thus leaving few traces.

==== Polynesia and Melanesia ====
Polynesians translocated many animals as they colonized the Pacific.

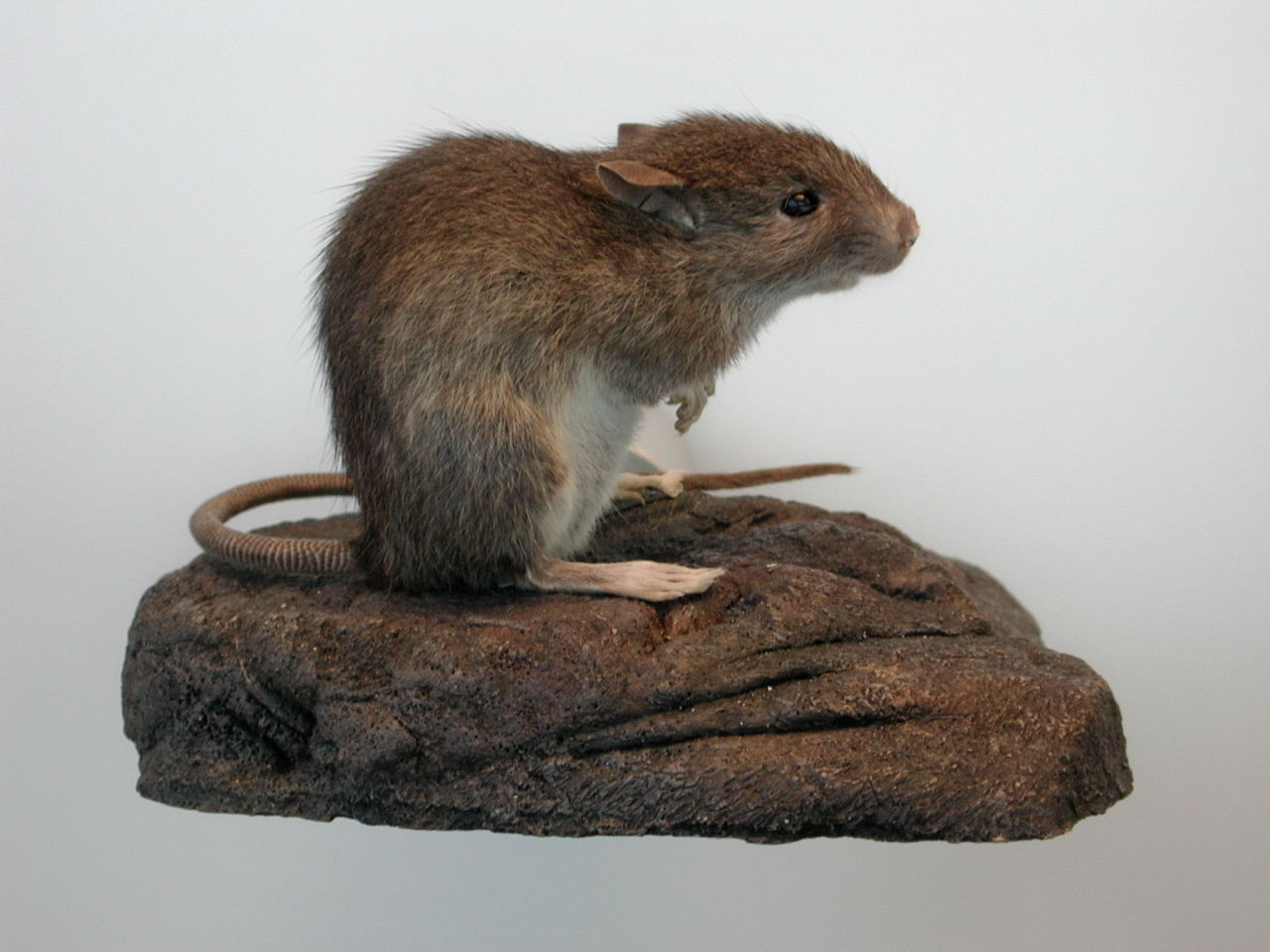
The invasive Polynesian rat adversely altered island ecosystems.

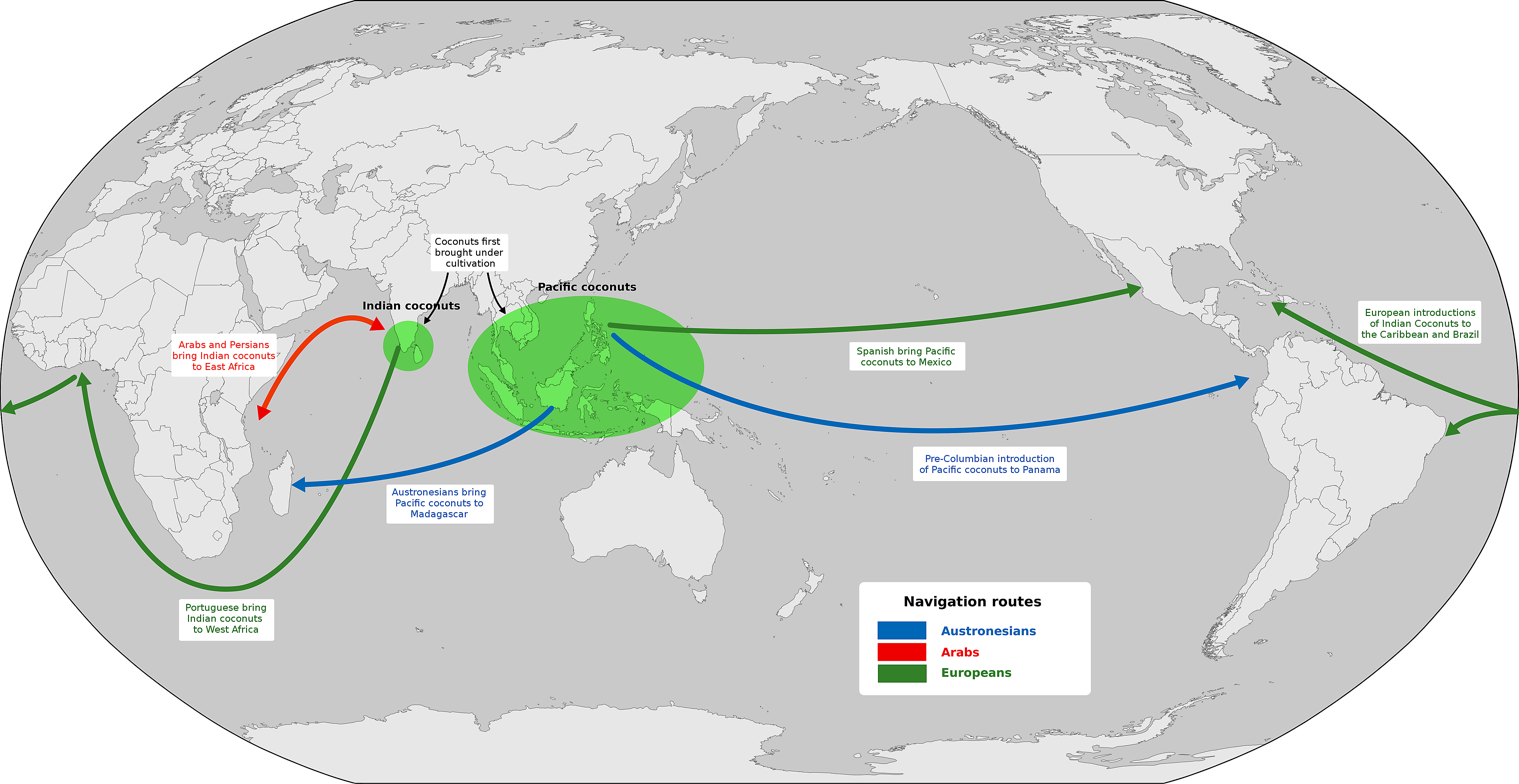
Dissemination of coconut trees across the Pacific

Most islands in the Pacific were settled in the late Holocene, and the arrival of humans caused rapid and significant ecological changes. In the eastern Polynesian islands, over 1,000 species of birds became extinct, particularly flightless birds vulnerable to introduced predators and larger birds favored by hunters. In the eastern Polynesian islands particularly, human activity resulted in extensive deforestation. Human activities that led to the extinctions and deforestation included hunting (birds, terrestrial animals, fish, and shellfish), clearing forest with fire (for cultivation as well as driving game), constructing irrigation systems and other structures, introducing domesticated species (pigs, chickens, and dogs), and introducing invasive species (rats, skinks, weeds, and geckos).

Polynesians and Melanesians cultivated a wide variety of crops, such as yams, bananas, taro, breadfruit, and coconuts. Some of these staple foods were domesticated and selectively bred. Agricultural techniques used included terracing, irrigation, slash-and-burn, and dryland farming.

In the Hawaiian Islands, Polynesian settlers altered the native vegetation by clearing land for agriculture, and the impacts were compounded by the effects of invasive rats introduced by humans. The Polynesians also built a dryland field system – covering 52 km^{2} – that left traces that were still visible in the 21st century. Several animal species became extinct soon after the arrival of Polynesians, including an ibis and four genera of geese or ducks.

Humans settled in Tonga about 3000 years ago, and soon thereafter the giant iguana and scrubfowl became extinct. The extinctions were so rapid that the time interval between the arrival of humans and the extinctions was less than the margin of error of the radiocarbon dating used to perform the dating.

Islands of Melanesia experienced dramatic environmental transformations after initial human settlement around 3,000 years ago. The islands of Fiji were studied to assess the impact of prehistoric humans on the environment, particularly the cause of prehistoric deforestation. Prior to settlement, fires in Fiji caused by lightning would occasionally occur on the islands, typically during periods of drought. (Note: The timing of the pre-settlement fires may have been influenced by El Niño.) After settlement, slash-and-burn anthropogenic fires were used by humans to prepare land for cultivation, and often led to deforestation.

===== Easter Island =====
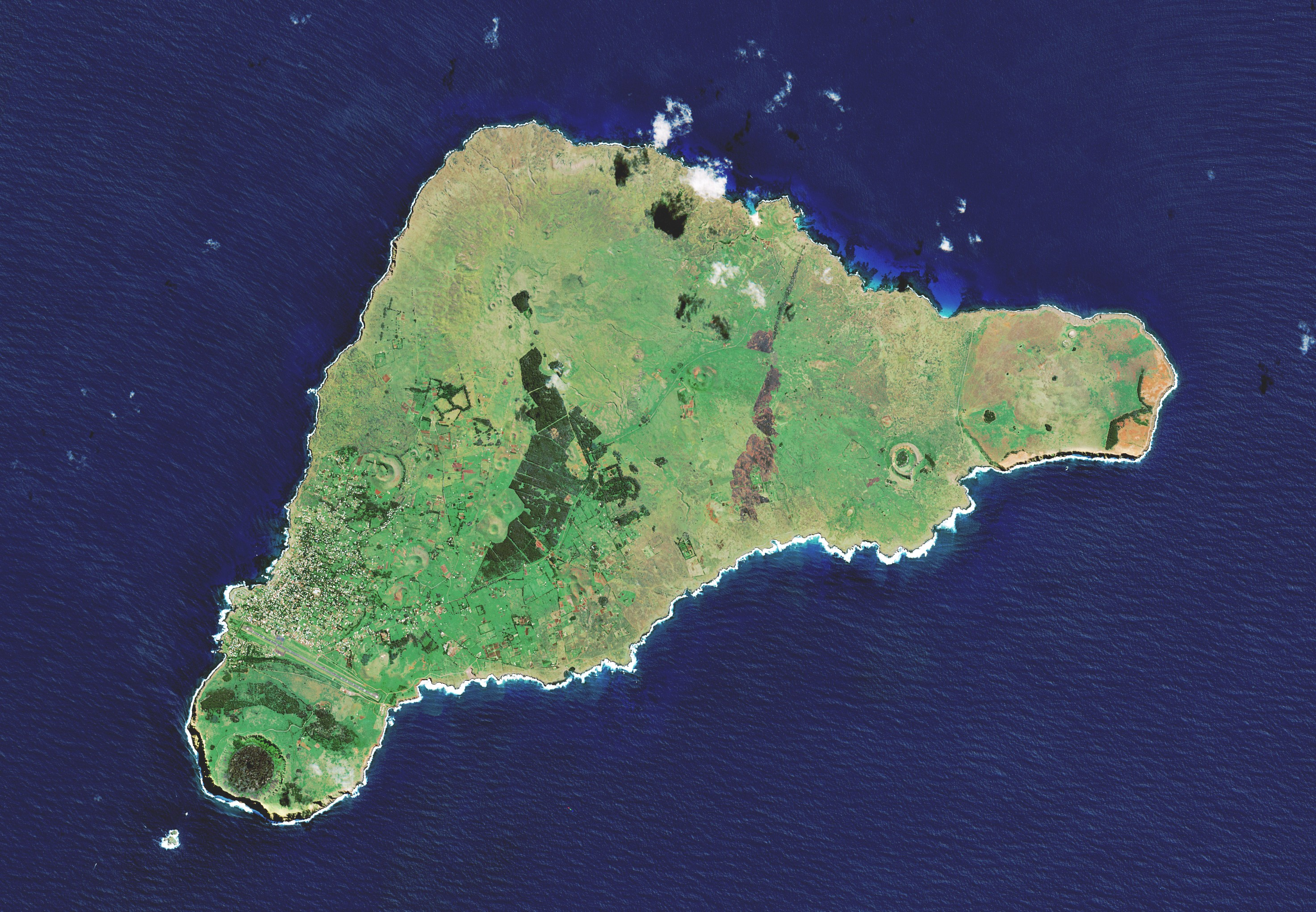
Easter Island originally had about 20 million palm trees, but they are now extinct and most of the island is deforested. Causes include clear-cutting by humans and natural climatic change.

Polynesians arrived on Easter Island between 800 and 1200 CE. (Note: Europeans first made contact with the Polynesians on Easter Island in 1722.) After their arrival, 18 plant species became extinct including two species of trees: the Easter Island palm and Sophora toromiro (the latter is extinct in the wild). Scientists estimate that the island had 20 million palms before the arrival of the Polynesians. The palm became extinct around 1650. In addition, several bird species became extinct. (Note: Birds that became extinct on Easter Island include two species of rails, two species of parrots, one species of owl, and one species of heron.)

Several causes for the deforestation and animal extinctions have been suggested, primarily anthropogenic: hunting, deforestation, and introduction of the Polynesian rat. Natural climatic changes have also been hypothesized as a synergistic, contributory factor. (Note: Diamond 2005 made arguments for an entirely human cause of deforestation, but Rull 2020 concluded that climatic change also played a major role.) The loss of nesting sea birds on the island possibly contributed to deforestation, because the birds' guano was an important nutrient for the island's vegetation.

== Contemporary applications ==
=== The Anthropocene ===
The 1945 Trinity test has been proposed as the start of the Anthropocene, but scholars of historical ecology have proposed a much earlier date of 10,000 years ago, near the start of the Holocene.

The Anthropocene is the period of Earth's history when human activity is the dominant influence on the planet's environment and ecosystems. (Note: In 2024, a proposal to establish a new, official geological epoch for the Anthropocene (using an epoch start date of around 1950) failed to gain approval from international scientific organizations.) There is no consensus on when the Anthropocene began, and several proposals have been made for the start date. Some proposals put the start date in the 20th century, but others have suggested that it should be about 10,000 years ago – based on the fact that human-driven alterations of the environment have been continuous, extending back at least that far. Another proposal puts the start of the Anthropocene even further in the past, when the first human-caused mass extinctions occurred, around 50,000 years ago.

=== The myth of pristine wilderness ===
Beginning in the 19th century, some Western scholars and colonizers thought the lands inhabited by Indigenous peoples were pristine wilderness, largely untouched by human activity prior to European arrival. This illusion is described as the "myth of pristine wilderness". (Note: Also called the "pristine myth".) The concept of pristine wilderness – meaning a landscape unchanged by any human activity – is primarily a Western notion, encountered particularly in Scandinavia, the USA, and Australia. The myth was first described in 1992 by several scholars, including William Denevan in an article published that year. Belief in the myth of pristine wilderness was widespread in the 19th and 20th centuries and continued into the early 21st century. (Note: Early believers in the myth of the pristine wilderness in the US included Henry David Thoreau and James Fenimore Cooper.)

In the 1990s, Denevan and several other scholars published research establishing that the vast majority of lands inhabited by prehistoric cultures were significantly modified by those peoples in virtually every location on Earth, although the nature and degree of the impact varied widely from location to location. The consensus of scholars is that there was virtually no pristine wilderness in any of the lands encountered by colonizers or Western peoples, and thus the myth is false. According to the geographer and explorer Alexander von Humboldt:

If travellers, the moment they set foot in a tropical region and ... imagine that they are within the precincts of a primeval forest, the misconception must be ascribed to their ardent desire of realizing a long-cherished wish. Every tropical forest is not primeval forest. I have scarcely ever used the latter term in the narrative of my travels. – Views of Nature (1850)

Related to the myth of pristine wilderness is the view held by some Westerners that prehistoric cultures universally lived in harmony with nature and endeavored to conserve and protect the environment. (Note: As early as the 1700s, Europeans were under the mistaken belief that Indigenous peoples (particularly in the New World) had not significantly altered their environment.) This notion is referred to as the myth of the "ecological noble savage". (Note: The term "ecological Indian" is also used, in a North American context, for the notion of ecological noble savage.) This myth is a recent variant of the noble savage cultural stereotype, which originated several hundred years ago in the Western imagination. (Note: The phrase "ecologically noble savage" was first used to describe the myth in 1990.) During the environmental movement of the 1970s, the myth of the ecological noble savage became widespread. The consensus of scholars is that the concept of the ecological noble savage was essentially false, and that prehistoric peoples transformed their habitat in virtually every place they inhabited, often resulting in significant, permanent changes to the ecosystem. (Note: According to the archaeologist Patrick Vinton Kirch: "The study of human ecodynamics also needs to confront head-on the issue of how past human societies perceived (or failed to perceive) environmental impacts, how social systems themselves adapted or responded to change, and the degree to which such systems could be resilient over long time cycles.")

=== Informing modern policies ===
The study of prehistoric impacts on the environment provides insights that can be used in the modern world to mitigate environmental damage and inform environmental policies. It may also provide motivation to revive extinct species, reintroduce species to regions where they have become locally extinct, or introduce species similar to those that became extinct (such as introducing elephants, cheetahs, and camels to North America). Historical examples of environmental impacts can also be used in improper ways, for example, to demonize modern Indigenous peoples, to justify intensive development of a region because it was already impacted, or to justify new, intensive damage to the environment because prehistoric peoples engaged in similar practices.
