= Mark D. McCoy =

American archaeologist

- Born: Delaware, U.S.
- Citizenship: American
- Education: University of New Mexico (BA 1997); University of Auckland (MA 1999); University of California, Berkeley (PhD 2006)
- Known for: Archaeology of the Pacific Islands; geospatial archaeology; dating of Nan Madol
- Awards: Book Award (Popular), Society for American Archaeology
- Scientific career
- Fields: Archaeology
- Workplaces: Florida State University, Tallahassee, FL, USA
- Website: myweb.fsu.edu/mm23cu/index.html

Mark D. McCoy is an American archaeologist, and Professor in the Department of Anthropology at Florida State University. His research concerns the ancient societies of the Pacific Islands, particularly Hawaiʻi, New Zealand, Rapa Nui and Micronesia, and the use of geospatial technologies such as geographic information systems, laser scanning and remote sensing in archaeology.

== Books ==
He is the author of Maps for Time Travelers: How Archaeologists Use Technology to Bring Us Closer to the Past (University of California Press, 2020), which won the Society for American Archaeology's Book Award in the popular category. In it he uses the device of time travel to explain to a general readership how digital mapping, laser scanning and remote sensing have changed archaeology. The journal Nature called it an "impassioned study written to change popular perceptions of archaeology". Author and archaeologist Brian Fagan described it as a “beautifully written book" and "an exceptional guide to the interdisciplinary world of today’s archaeology and history.”

With Patrick Vinton Kirch, McCoy is co-author of the revised edition of Feathered Gods and Fishhooks: The Archaeology of Ancient Hawaiʻi (University of Hawaiʻi Press, 2023), a rewriting of Kirch's 1985 synthesis of Hawaiian archaeology, which Choice named an Outstanding Academic Title.
