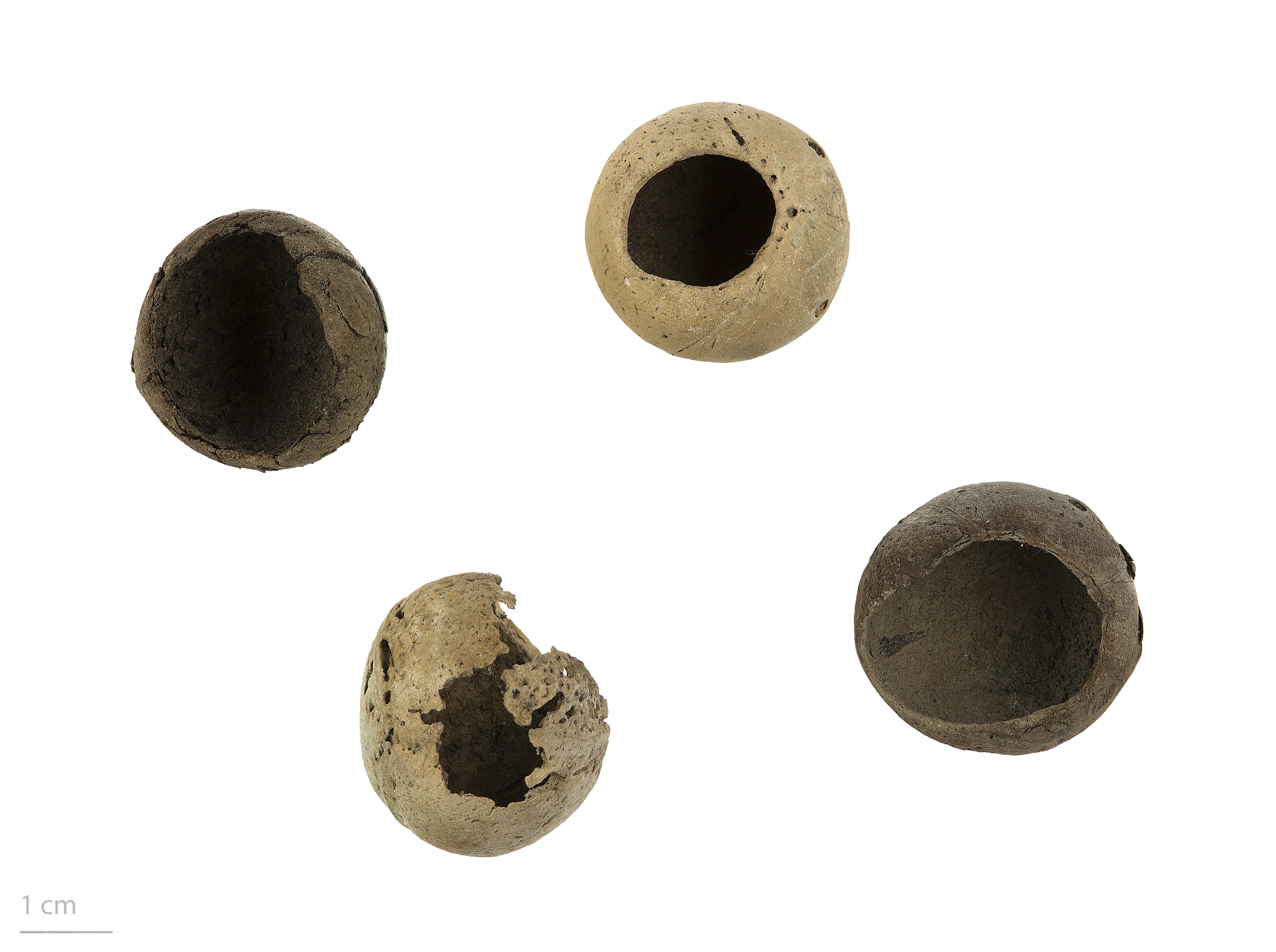
- Paschalococos disperta endocarps

Scientific classification
- Kingdom: Plantae
- Clade: Embryophytes
- Clade: Tracheophytes
- Clade: Angiosperms
- Clade: Monocots
- Clade: Commelinids
- Order: Arecales
- Family: Arecaceae
- Genus: †Paschalococos; J.Dransf.
- Species: †P. disperta

Binomial name
- †Paschalococos disperta J.Dransf.

= Paschalococos =

Paschalococos Temporal range: 0.035–0.0004 Ma Late Pleistocene-Recent

Extinct genus of palms

Paschalococos disperta, the Rapa Nui palm or Easter Island palm, formerly Jubaea disperta, was the native coccoid palm species of Easter Island. It disappeared from the pollen record circa AD 1650.

== Taxonomy ==
It is not known whether the species is distinct from Jubaea, but there is no evidence that it was Jubaea either, as the soft tissues used for the identification of coccoid genera have not been preserved. All that remain are pollen from lake beds, hollow endocarps (nuts) found in a cave, and casts of root bosses. Partly to avoid giving credence to the common but speculative assumption that the palms were Jubaea chilensis and used as rollers to move the moai statues of Easter Island, John Dransfield assigned the species to a new genus. The assignment is not accepted by the World Checklist of Selected Plant Families, which does not list the genus Paschalococos, nor by The Plant List which regards the name as "unresolved".

== Usage and extinction ==
The over-harvesting of wood, as well as the rats brought by human settlers, led to the extinction of the Rapa Nui palm between 1250 and 1500. Hogan believes loss of the Rapa Nui palm along with other biota contributed to the collapse of society on Easter Island. Dransfield suggests that the trees became extinct as they were cut down for the edible palm hearts as food supplies ran out due to overpopulation. It is also likely that many palms were cut down to build canoes for fishing. Another possibility is the Polynesian rat, brought in by settlers arriving between AD 800 and 1000, consumed the nuts of the palm, leaving insufficient numbers to reseed the island.

Despite the extinction of the tree, this palm appears to have been represented two hundred years later in the Rongorongo script of Easter Island with the glyph.
