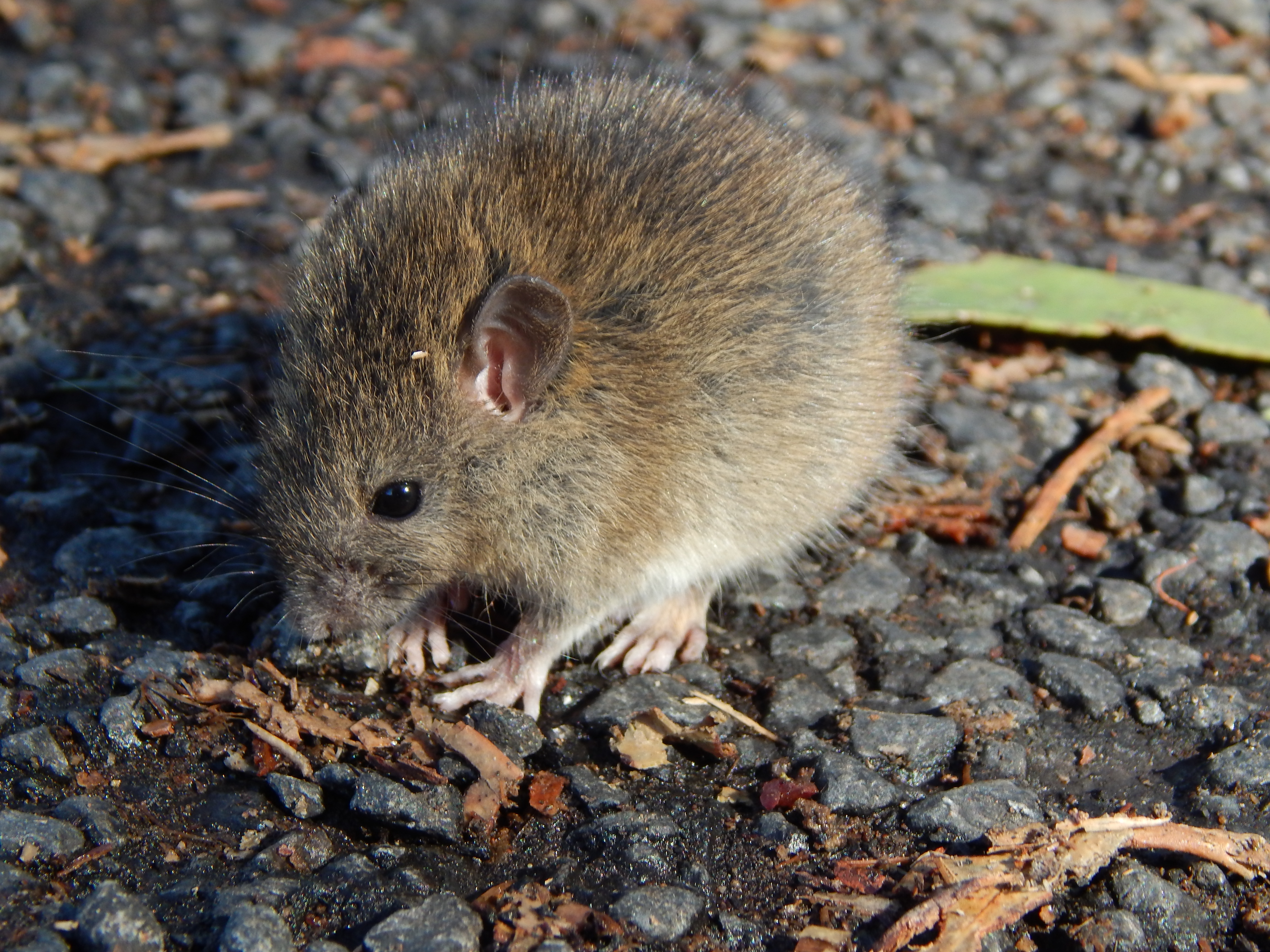

Conservation status
- Least Concern (IUCN 3.1)

- Secure (NatureServe)

Scientific classification
- Kingdom: Animalia
- Phylum: Chordata
- Class: Mammalia
- Order: Rodentia
- Family: Muridae
- Genus: Rattus
- Species: R. exulans

Binomial name
- Rattus exulans (Peale, 1848)
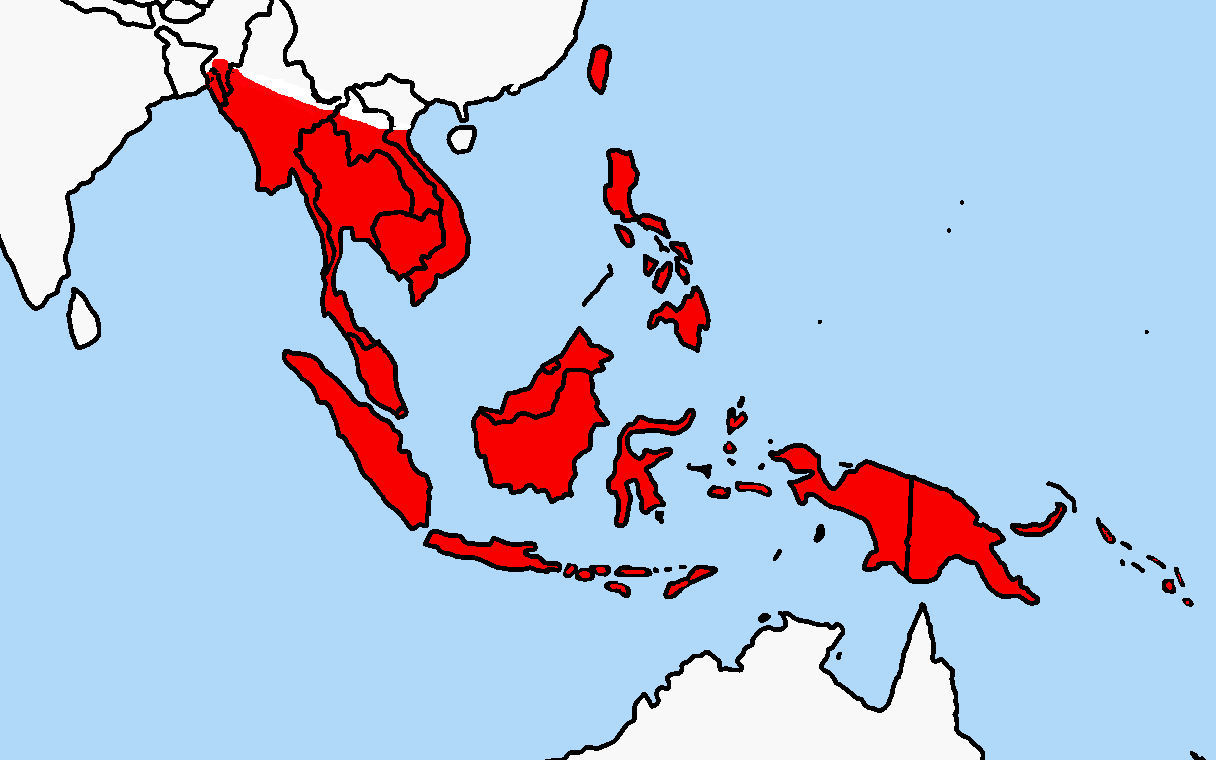
- Polynesian rat native range in Southeast Asia (in red) (note: the IUCN Red List instead considers it introduced throughout all of its Pacific islands range, as well as Brunei, Singapore, and the Philippines)

= Polynesian rat =

Polynesian rat Temporal range: Holocene

Species of rodent

The Polynesian rat, Pacific rat or little rat (Rattus exulans), or kiore, is the third most widespread species of rat in the world behind the brown rat and black rat. Contrary to its vernacular name, the Polynesian rat originated in Southeast Asia, and like its relatives has become widespread, migrating to most of Polynesia, including New Zealand, Easter Island, and Hawaii. It shares high adaptability with other rat species extending to many environments, from grasslands to forests. It is also closely associated with humans, who provide easy access to food. It has become a major pest in most areas of its distribution.

== Description ==
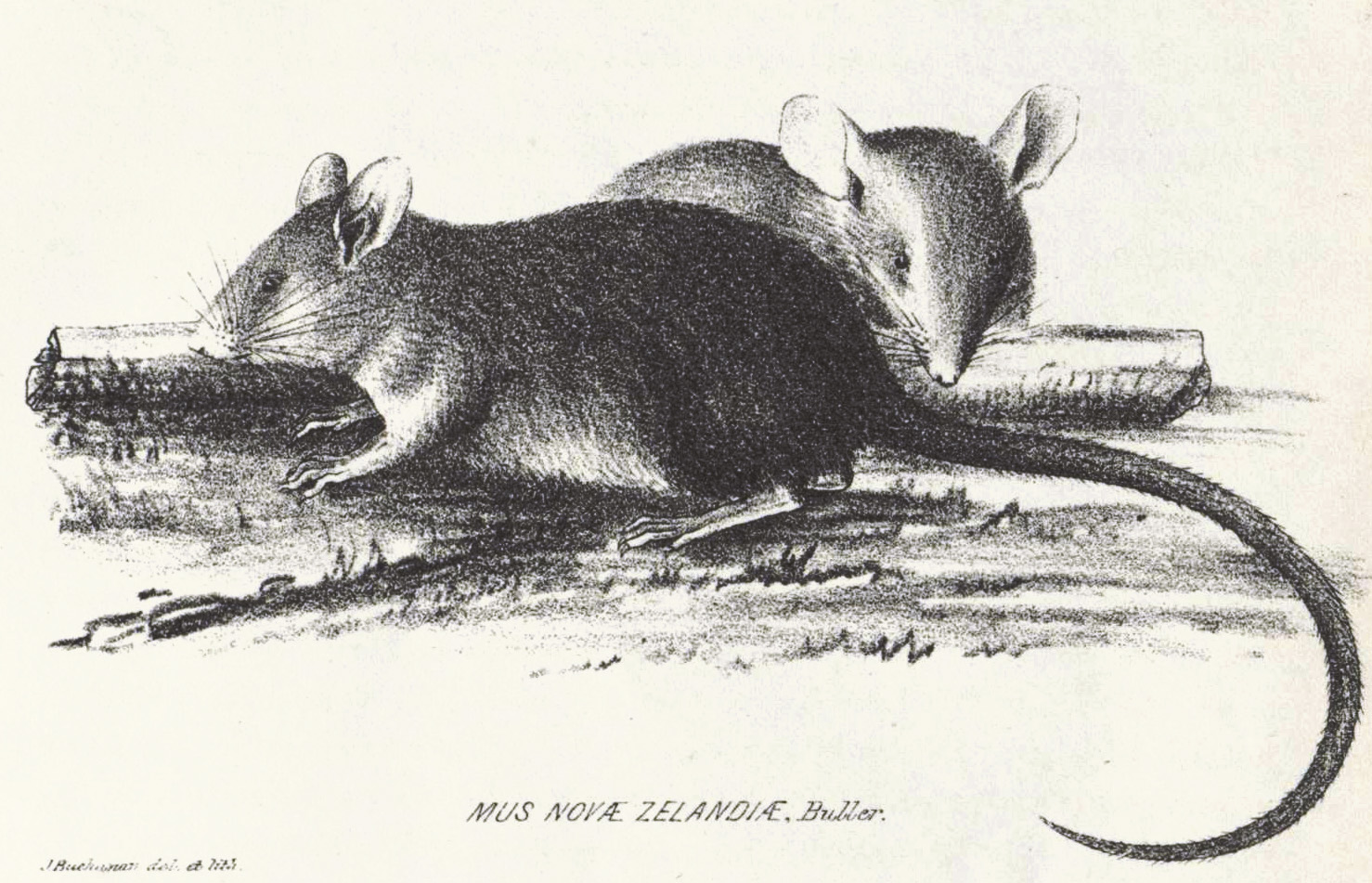
1870 illustration of Polynesian rats, referred to as Mus novæ zelandiæ

The Polynesian rat is similar in appearance to other rats, such as the black rat and the brown rat. It has large, round ears, a pointed snout, black/brown hair with a lighter belly, and comparatively small feet. It has a thin, long body, reaching up to 15 cm (5.9 in) in length from the nose to the base of the tail, making it slightly smaller than other human-associated rats. Where it exists on smaller islands, it tends to be smaller still – 11.5 cm (4.5 in). It is commonly distinguished by a dark upper edge of the hind foot near the ankle; the rest of its foot is pale.

== Distribution and habitat ==
The Polynesian rat is widespread throughout the Pacific and Southeast Asia. Mitochondrial DNA analysis suggests that the species originated on the island of Flores. The IUCN Red List considers it native to Bangladesh, all of mainland Southeast Asia, and Indonesia, but introduced to all of its Pacific range (including the island of New Guinea), the Philippines, Brunei, and Singapore, and of uncertain origin in Taiwan.

It cannot swim over long distances, so is considered to be a significant marker of the human migrations across the Pacific, as the Polynesians accidentally or deliberately introduced it to the islands they settled. The species has been implicated in many of the extinctions that occurred in the Pacific amongst the native birds and insects; these species had evolved in the absence of mammals and were unable to cope with the predation pressures posed by the rat. This rat also may have played a role in the complete deforestation of Easter Island by eating the nuts of the local palm tree Paschalococos, thus preventing regrowth of the forest. Archaeobotanical research showed that rat introduction in the Hawaiian island of Oʻahu caused population decline of native palms and shrubs in its lowland forests and subsequently expanded distribution of warm season grasses like Panicum.

Although remains of the Polynesian rat in New Zealand were dated to over 2,000 years old during the 1990s, which was much earlier than the accepted dates for Polynesian migrations to New Zealand, this finding has been challenged by later research showing the rat was introduced to both the country's main islands circa 1280.

== Behaviour ==
Polynesian rats are nocturnal like most rodents, and are adept climbers, often nesting in trees. In winter, when food is scarce, they commonly strip bark for consumption and satisfy themselves with plant stems. They have common rat characteristics regarding reproduction: they are polyestrous, with gestations of 21–24 days; their litter size is affected by food and other resources (6–11 pups); and weaning takes around another month at 28 days. They diverge only in that they do not breed year round, instead being restricted to spring and summer.

=== Diet ===
R. exulans is an omnivorous species, eating seeds, fruit, leaves, bark, insects, earthworms, spiders, lizards, and avian eggs and hatchlings. Polynesian rats have been observed to often take pieces of food back to a safe place to properly shell a seed or otherwise prepare certain foods. This not only protects them from predators, but also from rain and other rats. These "husking stations" are often found among trees, near the roots, in fissures of the trunk, and even in the top branches. In New Zealand, for instance, such stations are found under rock piles and fronds shed by nīkau palms.

== Rat control and bird conservation ==
=== New Zealand ===
In New Zealand and its offshore islands, many bird species evolved in the absence of terrestrial mammalian predators, so developed no behavioral defenses to rats. The introduction by the Māori of the Polynesian rat into New Zealand resulted in the eradication of several species of terrestrial and small seabirds.

Subsequent elimination of rats from islands has resulted in substantial increases in populations of certain seabirds and endemic terrestrial birds, as well as species of insects, such as the Little Barrier Island giant wētā. As part of its program to restore these populations, such as the critically endangered kākāpō, the New Zealand Department of Conservation undertakes programs to eliminate the Polynesian rat on most offshore islands in its jurisdiction, and other conservation groups have adopted similar programs in other reserves seeking to be predator- and rat-free.

However, two islands in the Hen and Chickens group, Mauitaha and Araara, have now been set aside as sanctuaries for the Polynesian rat.

=== Rest of the Pacific ===
NZAID has funded rat eradication programs in the Phoenix Islands of Kiribati in order to protect the bird species of the Phoenix Islands Protected Area.

Between July and November 2011, a partnership of the Pitcairn Islands Government and the Royal Society for the Protection of Birds implemented a poison baiting programme on Henderson Island aimed at eradicating the Polynesian rat. Mortality was massive, but of the 50,000 to 100,000 population, 60 to 80 individuals survived and the population has now fully recovered.
