= Patrick Vinton Kirch =

American archaeologist

Patrick Vinton Kirch is an American archaeologist and Professor Emeritus of Integrative Biology and the Class of 1954 Professor of Anthropology at the University of California, Berkeley. He is also the former Curator of Oceanic Archaeology in the Phoebe A. Hearst Museum of Anthropology, and director of that museum from 1999 to 2002. Currently, he is professor in the department of anthropology at the University of Hawai'i Manoa, and a member of the board of directors of the Bishop Museum.

== Early life ==
Kirch was born in Honolulu, Hawaii and was raised in Manoa valley from 1950s to 1960s. At the age of 13, he became an intern to Yoshio Kondo, a Bishop Museum malacologist. While there, he was studying Linnaean taxonomy and helped curate his mentor's collection of Polynesian snail shells. At the time, despite his strong interest in snails, he already had a passion for archaeology. Seeing it, Kondo suggested him to work with Kenneth Emory, a renowned Polynesian archaeologist. Unfortunately, Emory refused on working with Kirch, so Kondo took him under his wing so that Kirch could spend the whole summer conducting archaeological digs of his own.

A year later, securing the permission of a landowner and some help from his father, Kirch had dug out a three-by-three-foot test pit at Hālawa on Molokai. In the midden of the pit, he found bone and shell fragments, which he carefully assembled, counted and wrote up results on. The results made Emory furious, but Kondo insisted that Kirch did everything right and therefore deserved to go with him to the South Point's excavation site.

== Career ==
After graduating from the Punahou School, he attended University of Pennsylvania and Yale University, from which he obtained a Ph.D. in 1975. From 1975 to 1984 Kirch served on the staff of the Bernice P. Bishop Museum in Honolulu. Due to the research decline in mid-1980s, Kirch relocated to Seattle, Washington, in 1984, where he was a director of the Burke Museum of Natural History and Culture at the University of Washington and then became its associate professor. In 1989, he moved to California, where he took a position at the University of California, Berkeley, in the department of anthropology, where he held the Class of 1954 Chair from 1994 till July 2014.

His research focused on the archaeology, ethnography, and paleoecology of the Pacific Islands. He carried out original field research in Papua New Guinea, the Solomon Islands, the Loyalty Islands, Kingdom of Tonga, American Samoa, Yap, Belau, the Marshall Islands, the Cook Islands, French Polynesia (Mangareva, Mo'orea), and Hawai'i.

Kirch retired from the Berkeley faculty in July 2014, becoming chancellor's professor emeritus and Class of 1954 Professor Emeritus of Anthropology and Integrative Biology. He is currently a professor in the department of anthropology at the University of Hawai'i, Manoa.

He was one of the founders and the first president of the Society for Hawaiian Archaeology. In 2017 he was appointed to the board of directors of the Bishop Museum. He is a member of the advisory board of the Hawaiian Islands Land Trust, advising on the preservation of cultural sites.

His international collaborations include work with the Australian National University, the University of Auckland and University of Otago (New Zealand), and the University of French Polynesia (Tahiti). He is a member of the International Center for Archaeological Research on Polynesia, based at the University of French Polynesia. As a member of the U. S. National Academy of Sciences, he served as a liaison to the Pacific Science Association.

Through his work, he has come to the belief that practitioners of archaeology, historical linguistics, human genetic studies, ethnology, and archival historical research can work together to give a fuller picture of the past than any discipline alone could do.

== Awards and honors ==
In 1997 Kirch was awarded the John J. Carty Award from the National Academy of Sciences and in 2011 became recipient of the Herbert E. Gregory Medal for Distinguished Service to Pacific Science from the Pacific Science Association. He is also a Doctor Honoris Causa of the University of French Polynesia (2016).

Kirch's research was recognized by the National Academy of Sciences, the American Academy of Arts and Sciences, and the American Philosophical Society.

From 1997 to 1998, Krich was a fellow of the Center for Advanced Study in the Behavioral Sciences and, in 2010, Kirch was elected as an Honorary Fellow of the Australian Academy of the Humanities.

== Publications ==
Kirch has authored more than 250 books, monographs, articles, and chapters. His major books include:

- 1975 – Cultural Adaptation and Ecology in Western Polynesia:An Ethnoarchaeological Study(Published on microfilm by University Microfilms, Ann Arbor.)
- 1982 – Kirch, Patrick Vinton; Yen, D.E (1982). Tikopia; The Prehistory and Ecology of a Polynesian Outlier. Honolulu, Hawaii: Bishop Museum Press. ISBN 978-0-910240-30-7.
- 1985 – Feathered Gods and Fishhooks (Univ. Hawaii Press)
- 1994 – Anahulu: The Anthropology of History in the Kingdom of Hawaii, Volume 1: Historical Ethnography with Marshall Sahlins (University of Chicago Press)
- 1994 – The Wet and the Dry (Univ. Chicago Press)
- 1996 – Legacy of the Landscape: An Illustrated Guide to Hawaiian Archaeological Sites Honolulu: (University of Hawaii Press)
- 1997 – The Lapita Peoples (Blackwells)
- 1984 – The Evolution of the Polynesian Chiefdoms (Cambridge Univ. Press)
- 2000 – On the Road of the Winds: An Archaeological History of the Pacific Islands Before European Contact Berkeley: (University of California Press)
- 2001 – Hawaiki, Ancestral Polynesia: An Essay in Historical Anthropology. (with RogerGreen) (Cambridge: Cambridge University Press)
- 2002 – On the Road of the Winds: An Archaeological History of the Pacific Islands Before European Contact, University of California Press, 446 pages. ISBN 978-0-520-23461-1, ISBN 978-0-520-23461-1
- 2010 – How Chiefs Became Kings (Univ. California Press)
- 2012 – A Shark Going Inland Is My Chief: The Island Civilization of Ancient Hawai'i
- 2014 – Kua'āina Kahiko: Life and Land in Ancient Kahikinui, Maui
- 2015 – Unearthing the Polynesian Past: Explorations and Adventures of an Island Archaeologist
- 2019 – Heiau, 'Āina, Lani: The Hawaiian Temple System in Ancient Kahikinui and Kaupō, Maui with Clive Ruggles (University of Hawaii Press)
