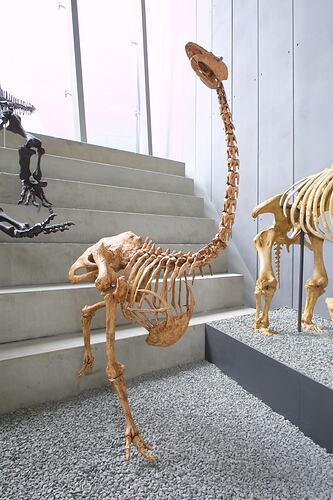
- Mounted skeleton, Melbourne Museum

Conservation status
- Extinct (NZ TCS)

Scientific classification
- Kingdom: Animalia
- Phylum: Chordata
- Class: Aves
- Infraclass: Palaeognathae
- Order: †Dinornithiformes
- Family: †Emeidae
- Genus: †Euryapteryx; Haast, 1874
- Species: †E. curtus

Binomial name
- †Euryapteryx curtus (Owen, 1846)

Synonyms
- List: Cela Reichenbach 1853 non Moehring 1758; Celeus Bonaparte 1856 non Boie 1831; Zelornis Oliver 1949; Dinornis curtus Owen, 1846; Cela curtus (Owen 1846) Reichenbach, 1850; Celeus curtus (Owen 1846) Bonaparte, 1865; Anomalopteryx curta (Owen 1846) Lydekker 1891; Euryapteryx curtus (Owen 1846) Archey 1941; Mesopteryx species α Parker 1895; Euryapteryx exilis Hutton, 1897; Zelornis exilis (Hutton 1897) Oliver 1949; Euryapteryx tane Oliver 1949; Dinornis gravis Owen, 1870; Pachyornis gravis (Owen 1870); Euryapteryx pygmaeus Hutton 1891 non Pachyornis pygmaeus Hutton 1895; Emeus gravipes Lydekker, 1891; Euryapteryx gravipes (Lydekker 1891) Oliver 1930; Euryapteryx compacta Hutton 1893; Emeus crassus Parker 1895 non (Owen 1846) Reichenbach 1853; Euryapteryx ponderosa Hamilton 1898 non Hutton 1891; Emeus boothi Rothschild 1907; Emeus haasti Rothschild 1907 non Palaeocasuarius haasti Rothschild 1907; Zelornis haasti (Rothschild 1907) Oliver 1949; Euryapteryx haasti (Rothschild 1907); Emeus parkeri Rothschild 1907; Euryapteryx kuranui Oliver 1930; Euryapteryx geranoides Checklist Committee 1990 non Palapteryx geranoides

= Broad-billed moa =

Broad-billed moa Temporal range: Pleistocene-Holocene

Extinct bird species

The broad-billed moa, stout-legged moa, or coastal moa (Euryapteryx curtus) is an extinct species of moa that was endemic to New Zealand. It is the only species in the genus Euryapteryx.

== Taxonomy ==
Euryapteryx curtus is a ratite and a member of the lesser moa family. The ratites are flightless birds with a sternum without a keel. They also have a distinctive palate.

A 2009 genetic study showed that the species Euryapteryx gravis is a junior synonym of E. curtus. Following this, a study published in 2010 explained size differences among the remains as being a result of sexual dimorphism, which also occurs in other moa species. A 2012 morphological study interpreted them as subspecies instead. E. c. curtus, the nominate subspecies, was labeled the "coastal moa", while E. c. gravis was the "stout-legged moa".

The cladogram below follows a 2009 analysis by Bunce et al.:

- Dinornithiformes
  - - Megalapteryidae
      - Megalapteryx didinus
    - Dinornithidae
      - Dinornis
        - D. robustus
        - D. novaezealandiae
  - Emeidae
    - Pachyornis
      - P. australis
      - - P. elephantopus
        - P. geranoides
    - - Anomalopteryx didiformis
      - - Emeus crassus
        - Euryapteryx curtus

== Description ==
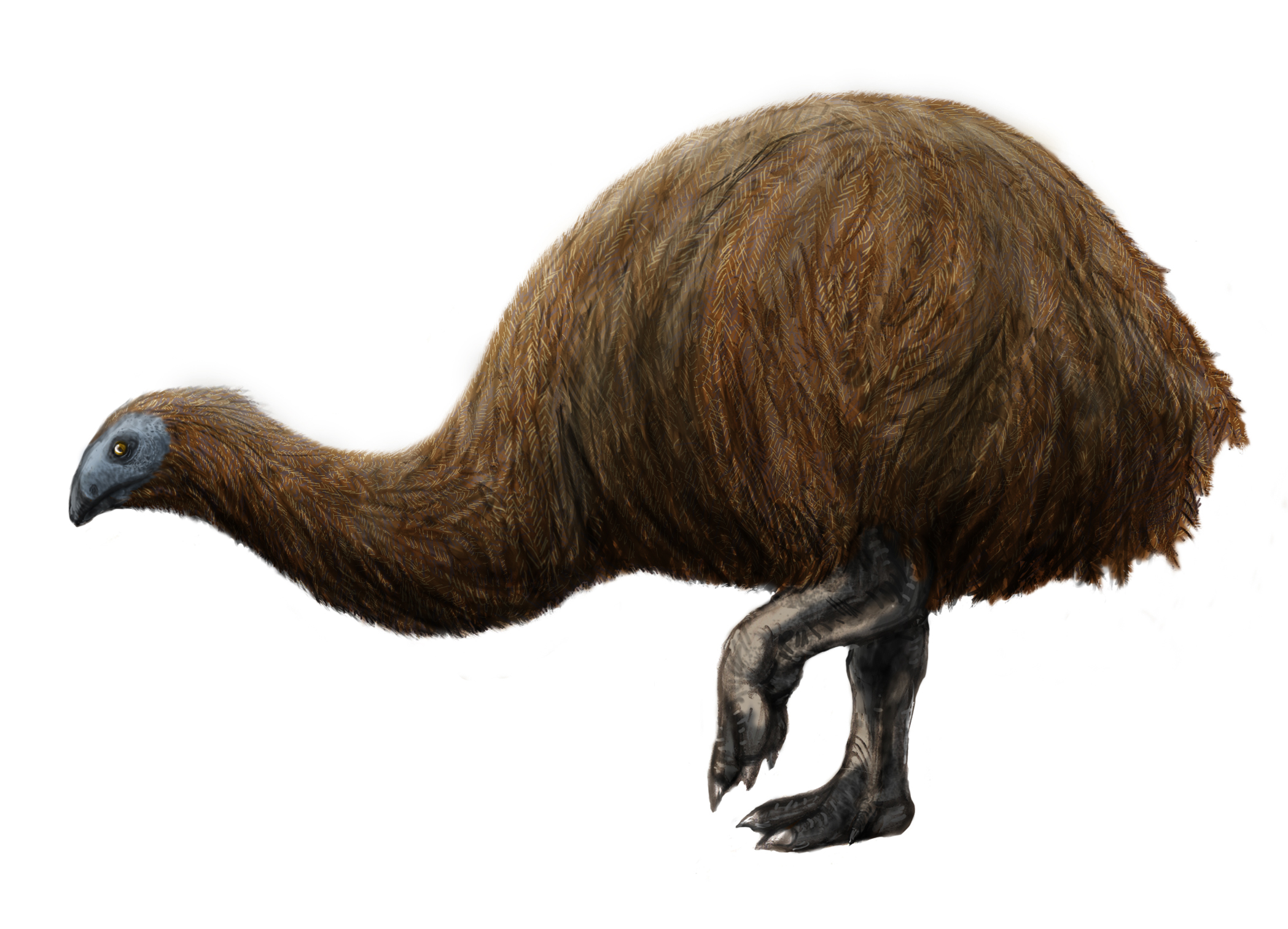
Life restoration

The broad-billed moa was a stout bird with a blunt and decurved bill, wide feet and short, thick legs. The species exhibits a notable variation in size due to sexual dimorphism: females generally weighed about twice as much as males. Like other moa, Euryapteryx curtus carried its head forward rather than upright, allowing it to comfortably feed on low-laying vegetation. Broad-billed moa also tended to be larger further south.

The windpipe of the broad-billed moa was elongated and looped through its body, which suggests that its call was deep and resonant, similar to that of the modern cassowary.

== Behaviour and ecology ==
=== Diet ===
Analysis of broad-billed moa gizzard remains and beak shape suggest that it primarily fed on leaves, fruits, and other herbaceous plants, unlike other moa species such as the giant moa, whose diet was more fibrous.

=== Reproduction ===
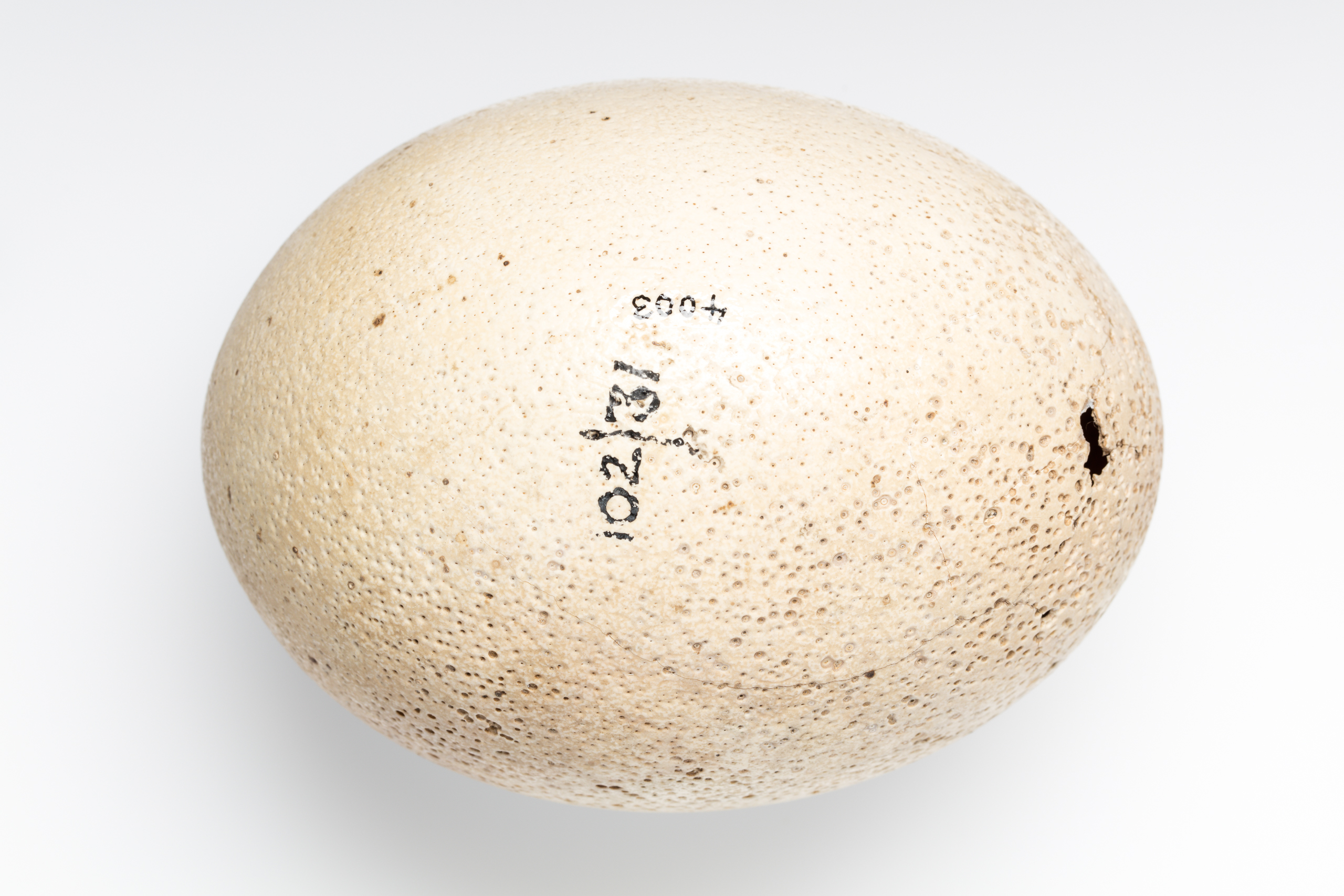
Egg specimen

Like other moa species, the broad-billed moa likely had a clutch of one or two eggs per nesting season.

As of 2006, half of all complete or mostly complete moa eggs in museum collections are likely broad-billed moa specimens. Of the specimens traditionally given the name Euryapteryx gravis, the eggs have an average length of 205 mm (8.1 in) and width of 143 mm (5.6 in), while the group traditionally assigned to the name Euryapteryx curtus had an average length of 122 mm (4.8 in) and width of 94 mm (3.7 in).

== Habitat and distribution ==
Euryapteryx curtus was one of the most widespread moa species, inhabiting mostly open areas. These moa lived on both the North and the South Islands of New Zealand, and remains have also been recovered from nearby Stewart Island. It inhabited lowland environments like duneland, forest, shrubland, and grassland.

== Extinction ==
The species presumably went extinct for the same reasons as proposed for other moa: overhunting by the Māori (who called them "moa hakahaka") after their arrival on the islands in the 14th century.
