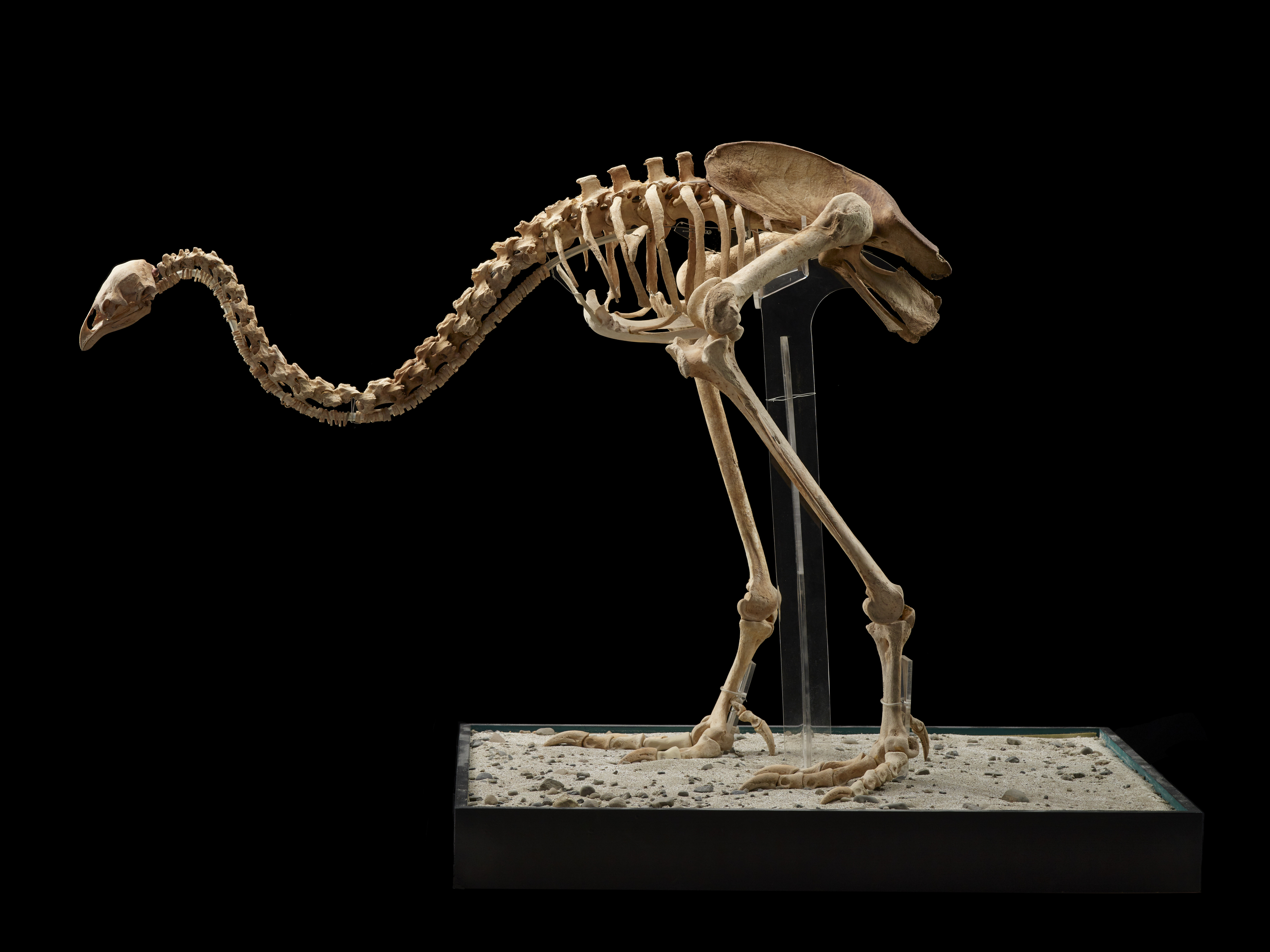
- Mounted skeleton from Honeycomb Hill Cave, collection of Te Papa

Conservation status
- Extinct (c. 1500) (NZ TCS)

Scientific classification
- Kingdom: Animalia
- Phylum: Chordata
- Class: Aves
- Infraclass: Palaeognathae
- Clade: Dinocrypturi
- Order: †Dinornithiformes
- Family: †Megalapterygidae; Bunce et al., 2009
- Genus: †Megalapteryx; Haast 1886
- Species: †M. didinus

Binomial name
- †Megalapteryx didinus (Owen, 1883)

Synonyms
- list: Palaeocasuarius Forbes 1892 ex Rothschild 1907; Dinornis didinus Owen 1882 ex Owen 1883; Anomalopteryx didina (Owen 1883) Lydekker 1891; Megalapteryx hectori Haast 1884 ex Haast 1886; Megalapteryx tenuipes Lydekker, 1891; Megalapteryx hamiltoni Rothschild 1907; Palaeocasuarius velox Forbes 1892 ex Rothschild 1907; Palaeocasuarius elegans Rothschild 1907; Palaeocasuarius haasti Forbes 1892 ex Rothschild 1907; Megalapteryx benhami Archey 1941

= Upland moa =

Upland moa Temporal range: Pleistocene-Holocene

Extinct species of flightless bird

The upland moa (Megalapteryx didinus) or moa pukepuke (Māori), is an extinct species of moa that was endemic to New Zealand. Richard Owen described the species in 1883. It belongs to the ratites, a group of predominantly flightless birds characterized by a sternum lacking a keel. Megalapteryx didinus is known from well preserved specimens, several of which retain impressions of soft tissues. The upland moa inhabited the South Island, where it primarily favored alpine and subalpine environments. Its diet consisted mainly of flowers, herbs and other vegetation. Following the arrival of the Māori, the species was hunted and became extinct around 1500 CE. It was the last known surviving species of moa.

== Taxonomy ==
The upland moa was named as Dinornis didinus in 1883 by Richard Owen from mummified material found in 1878 by H. L. Squires in Queenstown, New Zealand and subsequently sent to the British Museum. The holotype specimen consists of a mummified head and partial neck, and two mummified legs and feet which preserve the feathers.

In 2005, a genetic study suggested that Megalapteryx benhami, which had previously been considered a junior synonym of M. didinus, may be a valid species after all.

The cladogram below follows a 2009 analysis by Bunce et al.:

- Dinornithiformes
  - - Megalapteryidae
      - Megalapteryx didinus
    - Dinornithidae
      - Dinornis
        - D. robustus
        - D. novaezealandiae
  - Emeidae
    - Pachyornis
      - P. australis
      - - P. elephantopus
        - P. geranoides
    - - Anomalopteryx didiformis
      - - Emeus crassus
        - Euryapteryx curtus

== Description ==
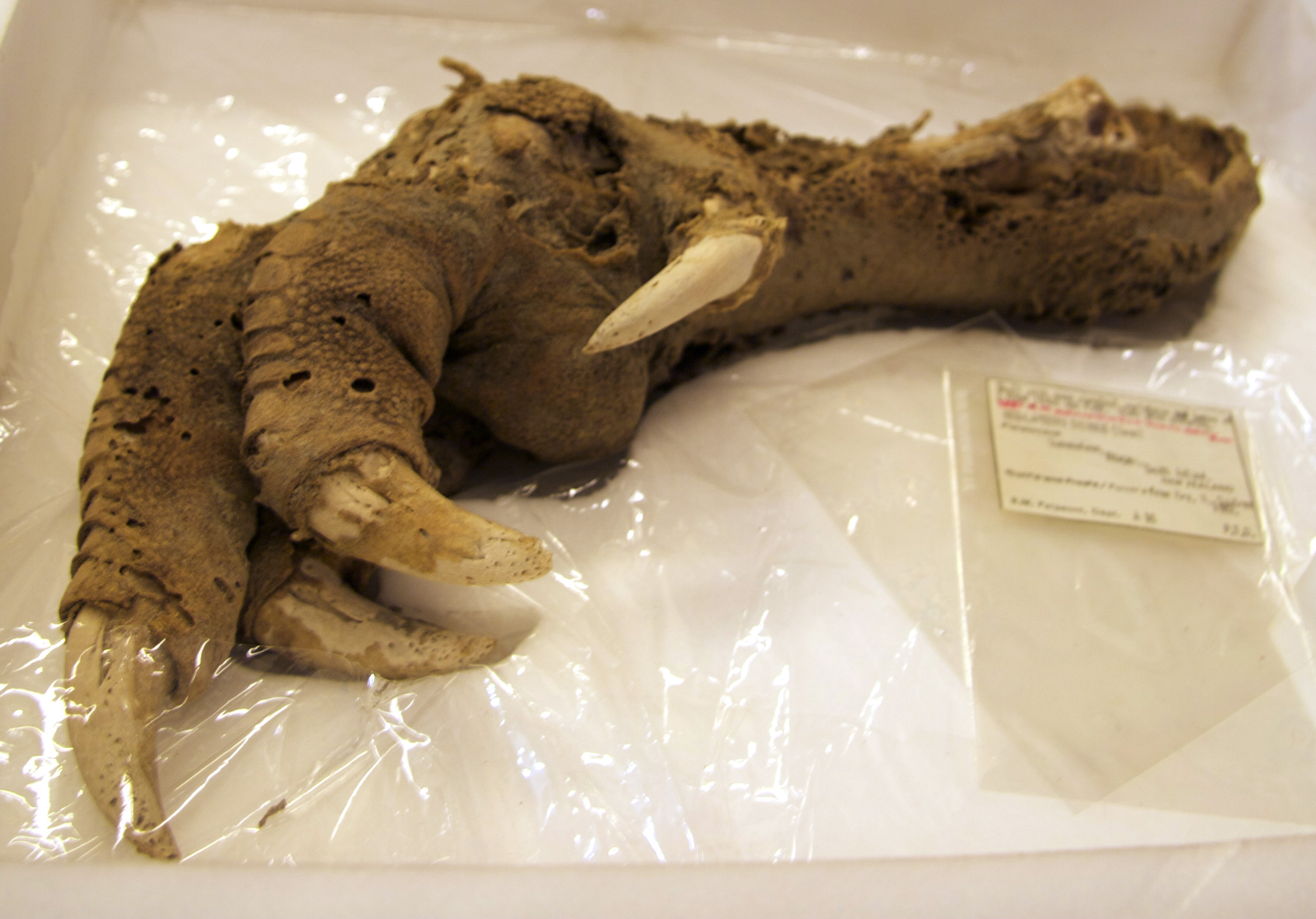
Preserved foot of the holotype specimen

At less than 1 metre (3.3 ft) tall and about 17 to 34 kilograms (37 to 75 lb) in weight, the upland moa is among the smallest known moa species. Unlike other moas, it had feathers covering all of its body but the beak and the soles of its feet, an adaptation to living in cold environments. Scientists previously believed that the upland moa held its neck and head upright; however, more recent study has shown that it actually carried itself in a stooped posture, with its head level to its back. This would have helped it travel through the abundant vegetation present in its habitat, whereas an extended neck would have been more suited to open spaces. The upland moa had no wings or tail.

=== Soft tissue ===
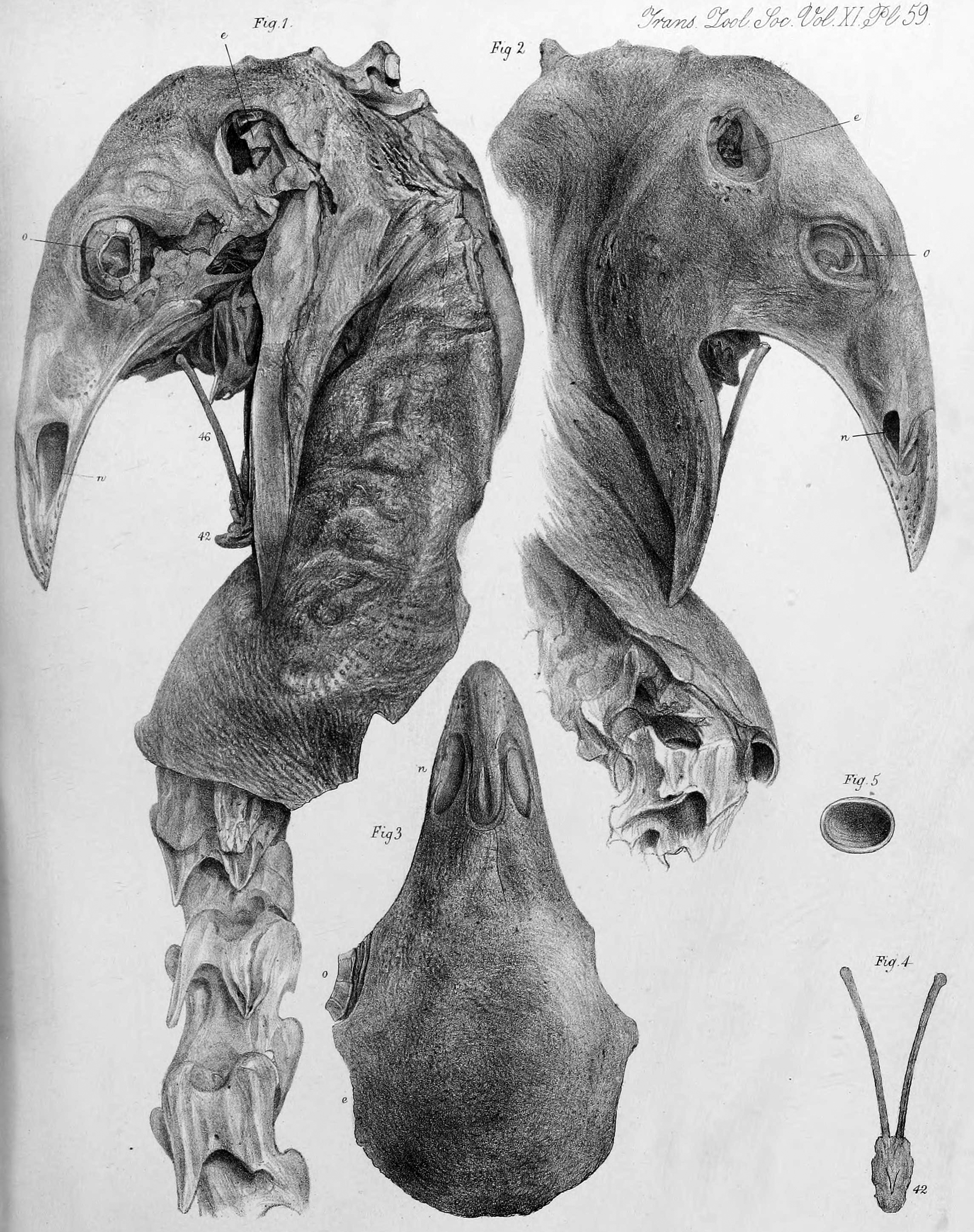
Mummified head of the holotype, as illustrated in Owen's 1883 article

The species has the best-preserved mummified remains of any moa species. Several specimens with soft tissue and feather remains are known:

- British Museum A16, found at Queenstown in 1876, is the type of the species preserving a mummified head and partial neck along with two mummified partial hindlimbs.
- Otago Museum C.68.2A, leg with much muscle tissue, skin and feathers from the Old Man Range
- Museum of New Zealand Te Papa Tongarewa NMNZ S.000400, a skeleton with tissue on neck and head from the Cromwell area.
- MNZTPT NMNZ S.023808, a foot with some muscle and sinews, found on 7 January 1987 at Mount Owen. This was dated to be about 3,300–3,400 years old.
- MNZTPT NMNZ S.027950, feathers found in 1949 at Takahe Valley, Fiordland, New Zealand.
- Canterbury Museum NZ 1725, Remains of one partial egg which have been found at the Rakaia River in 1971 are tentatively attributed to this species. The radiocarbon date of approximately AD 1300–AD 1400 is in line with this. Unusually, the eggshell is dark olive green, but even if the egg is of M. didinus, the shell colour may have varied between individual eggs.
- MNZTPT NMNZ S.023700, complete skeleton found by Trevor Worthy in March 1987 at Honeycomb Hill Cave, Oparara Valley
- Otago Museum AV10049, skeleton and partial egg found in 2002 at Serpentine Range, Humboldt Mountains.

== Behavior and ecology ==
The upland moa was herbivorous, its diet extrapolated from fossilised stomach contents, droppings, and the structure of its beak and crop. It ate leaves and small twigs, using its beak to "shear [...] with scissor-like moves". However, biomechanical testing of its beak and head has shown it was best suited to feed by pulling backwards, possibly while twisting its head to the side. Its food required grinding before it could be digested, as indicated by its large crop. Studies of the upland moa's coprolites have provided evidence that branchlets of trees such as Nothofagus, various lake-edge herbs, tussock, and nectar-rich flowers made up part of its diet. Based on the pollen present in the coprolites, it is suggested they had a similar lifestyle to the living takahē, feeding in high alpine areas during the summer and descending to lower altitude forests in the winter. They may also have played an important role in the seed dispersal of alpine plants.

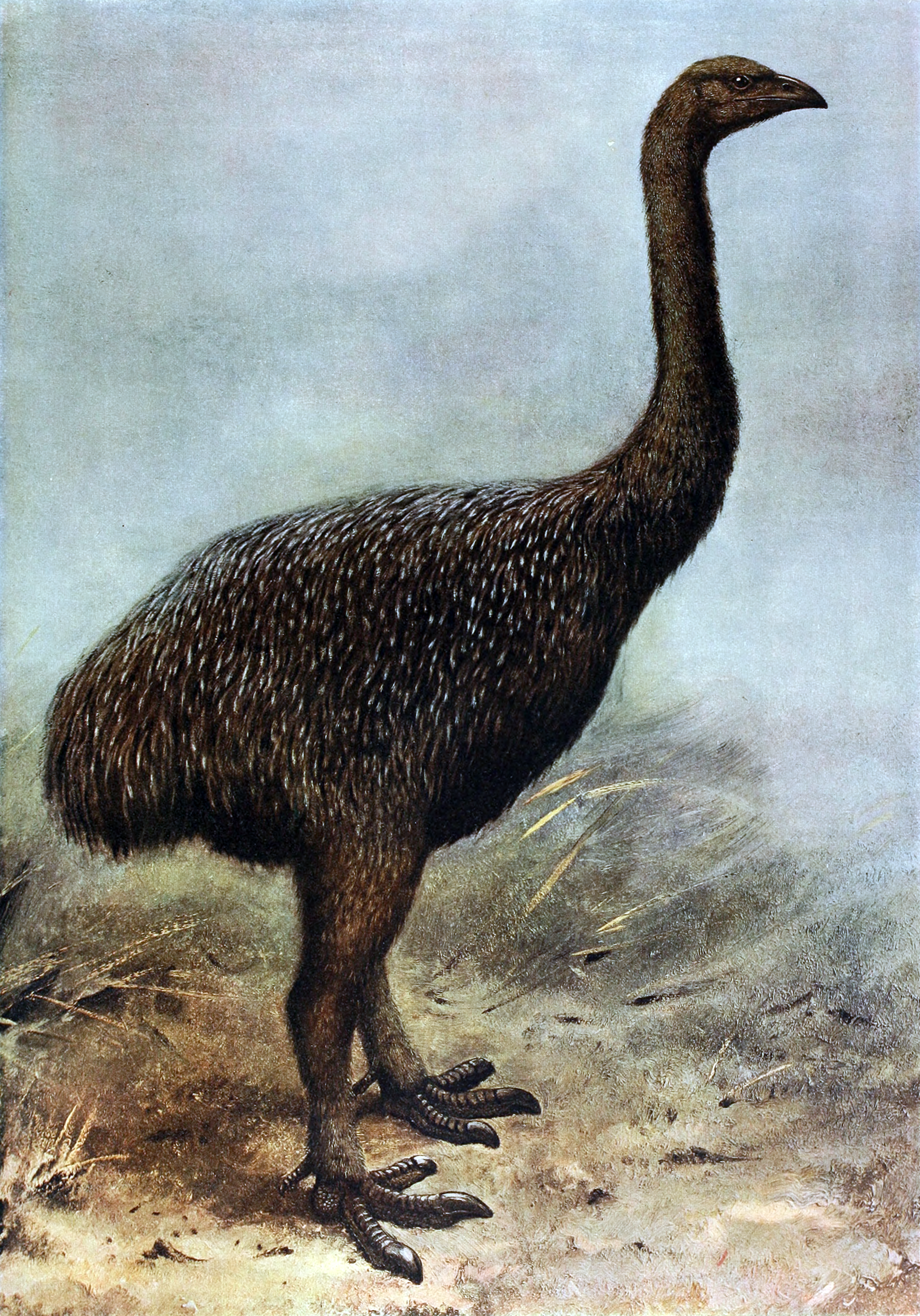
Restoration from 1907

This moa usually laid only 1 to 2 blue-green coloured eggs at once, and was likely the only type of moa to lay eggs that were not white in colour. Like the emu and ostrich, male moa cared for the young. The upland moa's only predator before the arrival of humans in New Zealand was Haast's eagle (Hieraaetus moorei).

=== Distribution and habitat ===
The upland moa lived only on New Zealand's South Island, in mountains and sub-alpine regions. They travelled to elevations as high as 2000 m (7000 ft) above sea level.

=== Extinction ===
Humans first came in contact with the upland moa around AD 1250 to AD 1300, when the Māori people arrived in New Zealand from Polynesia. Moa, being docile animals, were an easy source of food for the Māori (who called them "moa pukepuke"), and the birds were eventually hunted to extinction in AD 1445.
