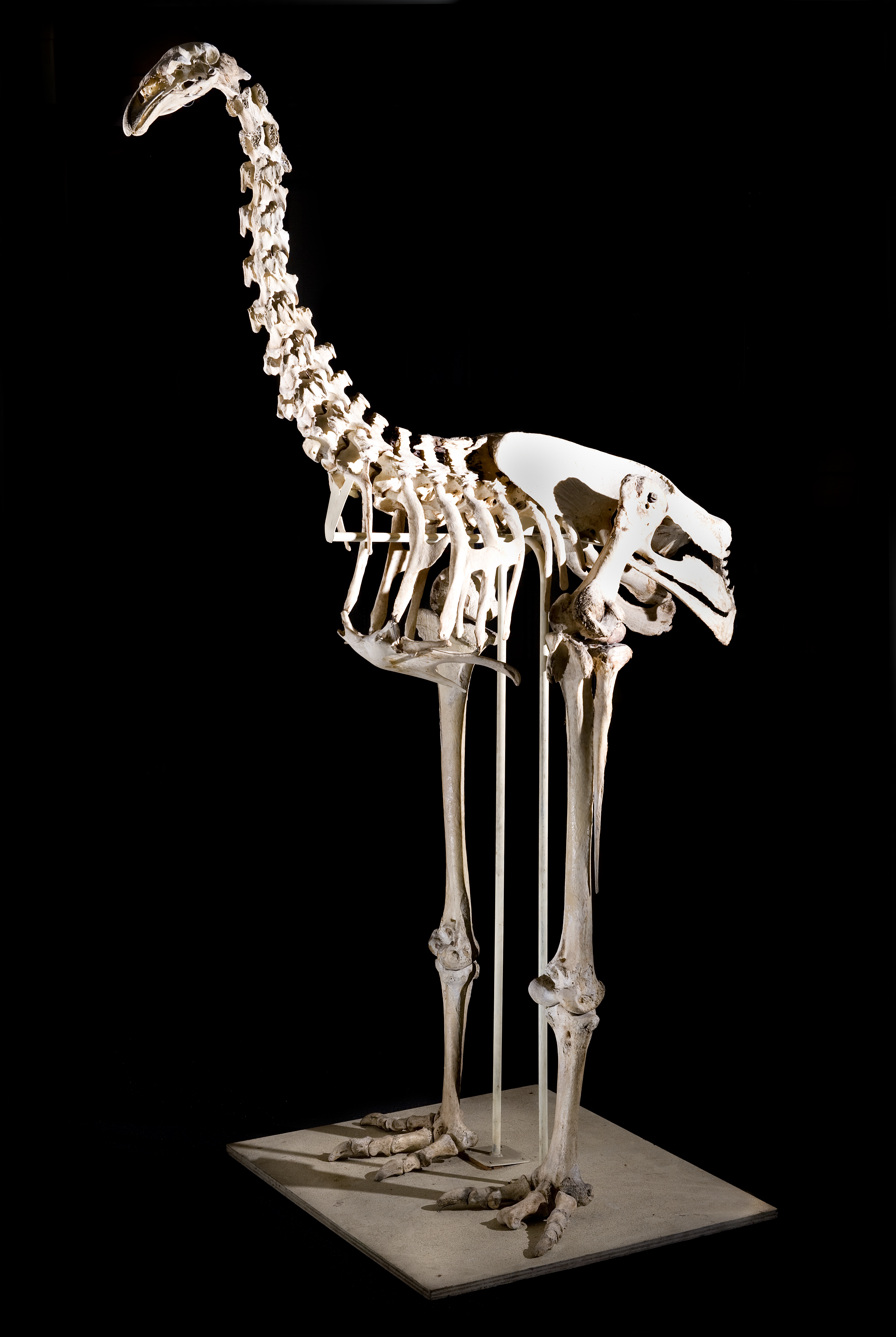
- Skeleton, likely of an adult male

Conservation status
- Extinct

Scientific classification
- Kingdom: Animalia
- Phylum: Chordata
- Class: Aves
- Infraclass: Palaeognathae
- Order: †Dinornithiformes
- Family: †Dinornithidae
- Genus: †Dinornis
- Species: †D. robustus

Binomial name
- †Dinornis robustus Owen, 1846

Synonyms
- List: Dinornis ingens var. robustus Owen, 1846; Palapteryx robustus (Owen, 1846) Owen, 1851; Dinornis maximus Haast, 1869; Dinornis altus Owen, 1879; Dinornis validus Hutton, 1891; Dinornis potens Hutton, 1891; Dinornis strenuus Hutton, 1893; Dinornis torosus Hutton, 1891; Palapteryx plenus Hutton, 1891

= South Island giant moa =

South Island giant moa Temporal range: Late Holocene

Extinct species of bird

The South Island giant moa (Dinornis robustus) is an extinct species of moa in the genus Dinornis, known in Māori by the name moa nunui. It was one of the tallest-known bird species to walk the Earth, exceeded in weight only by the heavier but shorter extinct elephant bird of Madagascar.

== Taxonomy ==
Moa were ratites: large, flightless birds with a sternum, but lacking a keel. (Note: Recent genetic research has incorporated the grouse-like Southern American tinamous clearly into the middle of the ratites; so now there are mid-weight ratites which can fly, even though even the tinamous prefer to remain on the ground.) They also had a distinctive jaw and palate. The origin of these birds is becoming clearer, and it is now believed that early, volant ancestors of these birds dispersed into the Southern Hemisphere, where most flightless ratites have been found.

Despite being geographically closer to the kiwi, phylogenetic analyses based on recovered DNA show moa to have been closest to the Central and South American tinamous. South island giant moa belong to the genus Dinornis, and are placed within their own family, Dinornithidae, along with their close relative Dinornis novaezealandiae from the North Island. These, along with the extinct upland moa and tinamous, are among the most basal palaeognaths.

The cladogram below follows a 2009 analysis by Bunce et al.:

- Dinornithiformes
  - - Megalapteryidae
      - Megalapteryx didinus
    - Dinornithidae
      - Dinornis
        - D. robustus
        - D. novaezealandiae
  - Emeidae
    - Pachyornis
      - P. australis
      - - P. elephantopus
        - P. geranoides
    - - Anomalopteryx didiformis
      - - Emeus crassus
        - Euryapteryx curtus

== Description ==
=== Size ===
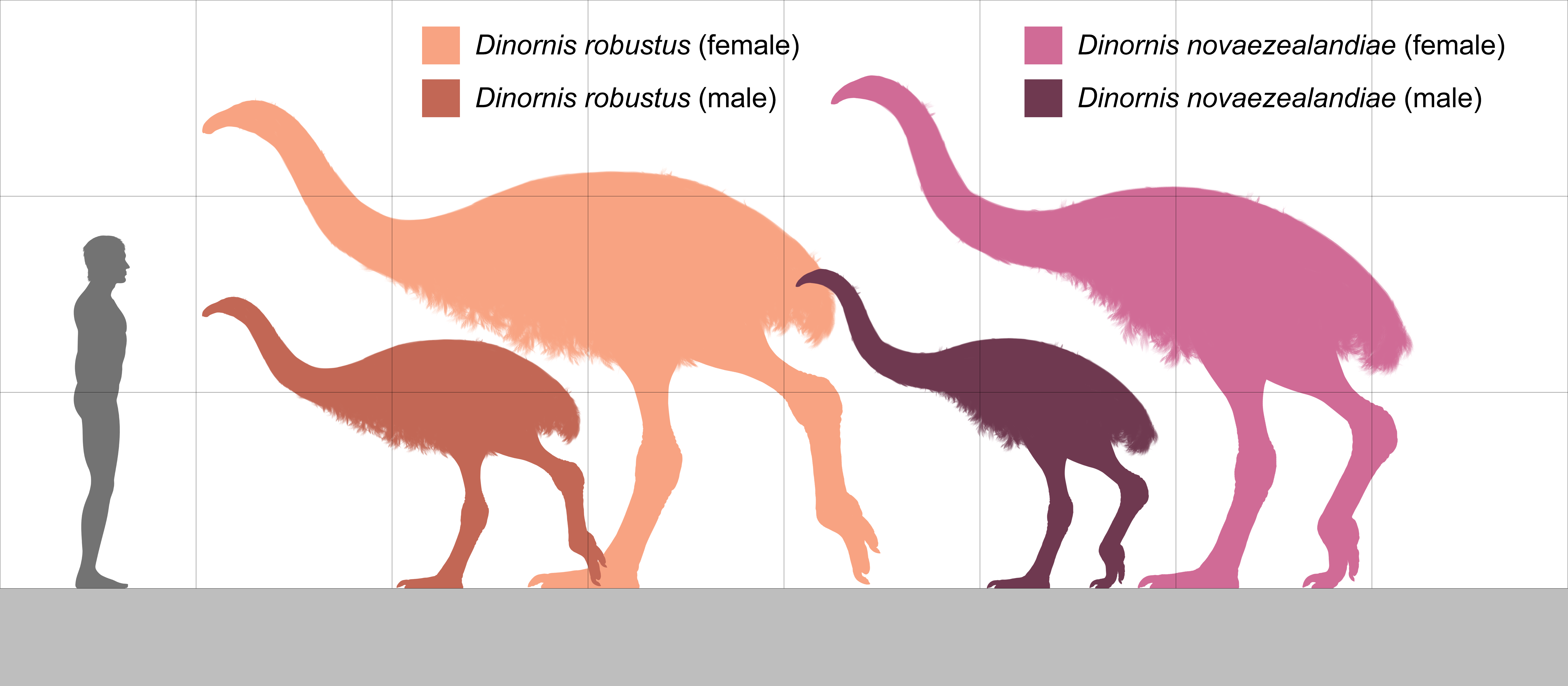
Size diagram of Dinornis species, showing strong sexual dimorphism between smaller males and larger females

The South Island giant moa was the largest species of moa. Adult females stood up to 2 metres (6 ft 7 in) tall at the back, and could reach foliage up to 3.6 metres (11 ft 10 in) off the ground, making them the tallest bird species known. Despite their great height, Dinornis robustus was found to have weighed only 200 kilograms (440 lb) on average, with upper estimates of around ≥250 kilograms (550 lb) for females. Only one specimen of a complete or partially complete moa egg has been assigned to the South Island giant moa, found around Kaikōura. This egg, 240 millimetres (9.4 in) in length and 178 millimetres (7.0 in) in width, was the largest moa egg found in museum collections as of 2006.

=== Anatomy ===
Very large-bodied, they had proportionately small heads, a trait found across all ratites. Analysis of their skull shows that they had somewhat poor eyesight due to their small orbits, rounded bills, and a very acute sense of smell thanks to a strongly developed olfactory system. Dinornis had thinner leg bones than other moa, indicating that they were more agile, though they likely moved slowly and cautiously. Unusually, giant moas were the only large ratites that sported a hallux (the first digit of the foot). Uniquely, the moa were essentially wingless; the only remnant of a wing was the scapulocoracoid bone, which, at one point earlier in its evolution, was where the humerus should have attached.

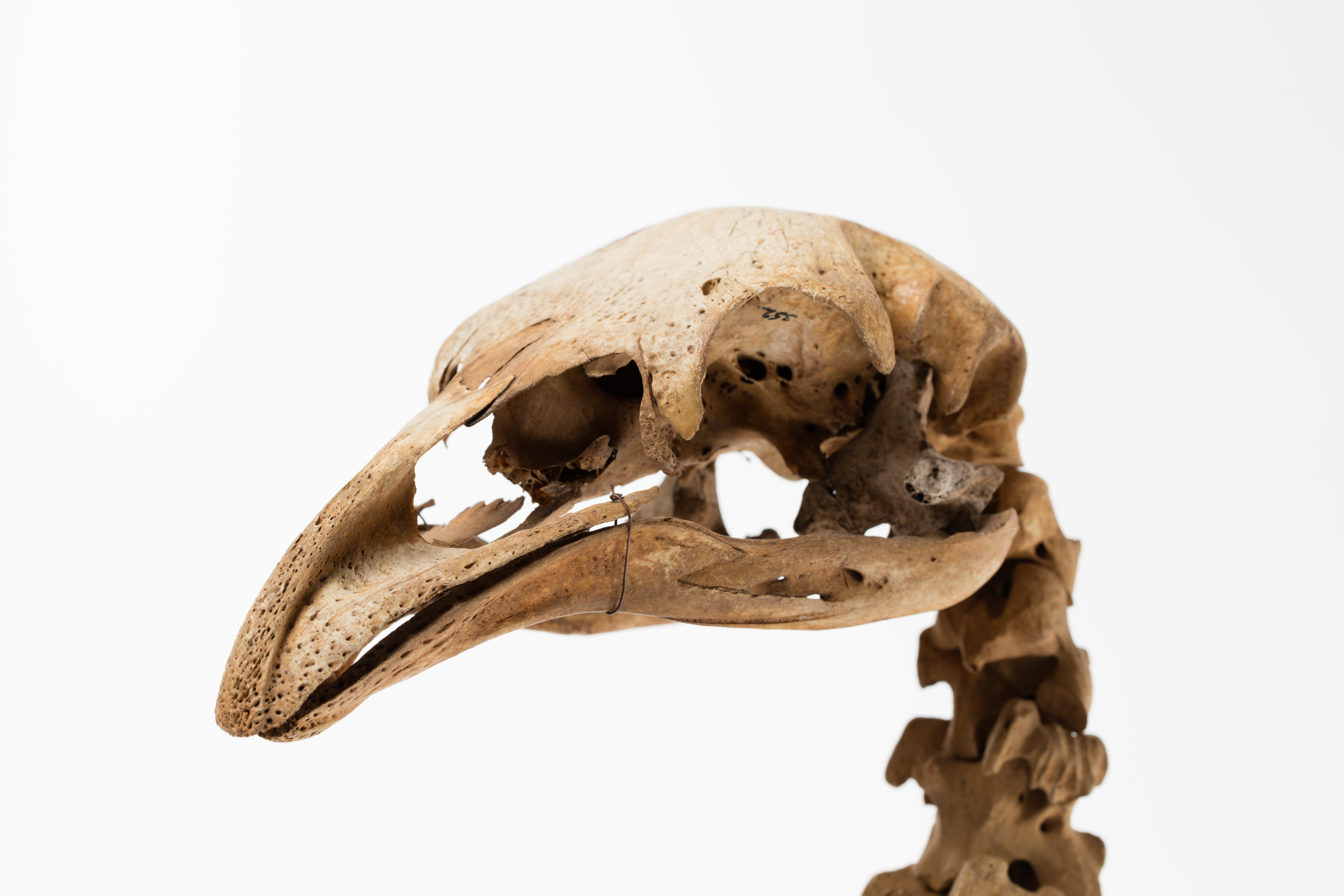
Head

=== Appearance ===
Giant moas were likely fully feathered, except for their heads and a small portion of the neck, as well as the tarsus and feet. Feathers belonging to this species have been found, revealing that its plumage was plain brown or slightly streaked.

== Behaviour and ecology ==
D. robustus, along with its relatives, were quite eccentric birds. Although they could reach 11+ feet in height, they mostly held their necks horizontally rather than vertically, like their distant relatives, the kiwi.

=== Feeding ===
Moa most likely filled a diurnal role in their ecosystem, similar to that of emus.

Because New Zealand lacked any native terrestrial, herbivorous mammals, the moa filled that niche. Giant moas in particular are ecologically equivalent to giraffes and other long-necked plant-eating megafauna, though they lack any living analogues in New Zealand. These birds sported a very robust bill, and finds of a relatively large collection of gizzard stone for grinding food indicate a highly fibrous diet. Most foraging took place in forests and open fields, with fossilized coprolites revealing the diet of D. robustus to have included twigs, seeds, berries, leaves, flowers, vines, herbs, and shrubs. It's likely that this species fed on vegetation that was unable to be digested by other species, therefore avoiding competition with other grazers. Their bill would have allowed them to feed by means of cutting and breaking twigs and stems via lateral shaking. In addition to their bills, moas had stronger neck muscles than other ratite families, which might have given them a stronger pulling / tugging force. They also could have used their necks to reach higher vegetation, if necessary.

=== Reproduction ===
Giant moas were most likely long-lived birds which took many years to reach full maturity. Similar to cassowaries, females likely would have competed for males, seeing as they were much larger. It is likely that the males would have primarily reared the chicks, as the female would have been too large to incubate the weak-shelled eggs; however, their method of incubation is still unknown. They nested in rock shelters from late spring to early summer. Chicks are speculated to have been striped, like those of other ratites.

=== Habitat ===
Dinornis robustus lived on the South Island of New Zealand as well as in Rakiura and Native Island, and its habitat was centered around the lowlands (shrubland, duneland, grassland, and forests).

== Extinction ==
Along with other members of the moa family, the South Island giant moa went extinct due to predation from humans in the 15th century, about 200 years after colonisation by the Māori.

=== De-extinction Efforts ===
In 2025, the U.S.-based biotechnology company Colossal Biosciences announced plans to attempt the de-extinction of the South Island giant moa. The project, conducted in partnership with the Ngāi Tahu Research Centre at the University of Canterbury, aims to reconstruct the moa's genome using ancient DNA and comparative genomics. Colossal Biosciences has described the effort as a cultural and ecological restoration, rather than purely a scientific experiment. The company estimates that a viable moa could be produced within five to ten years.

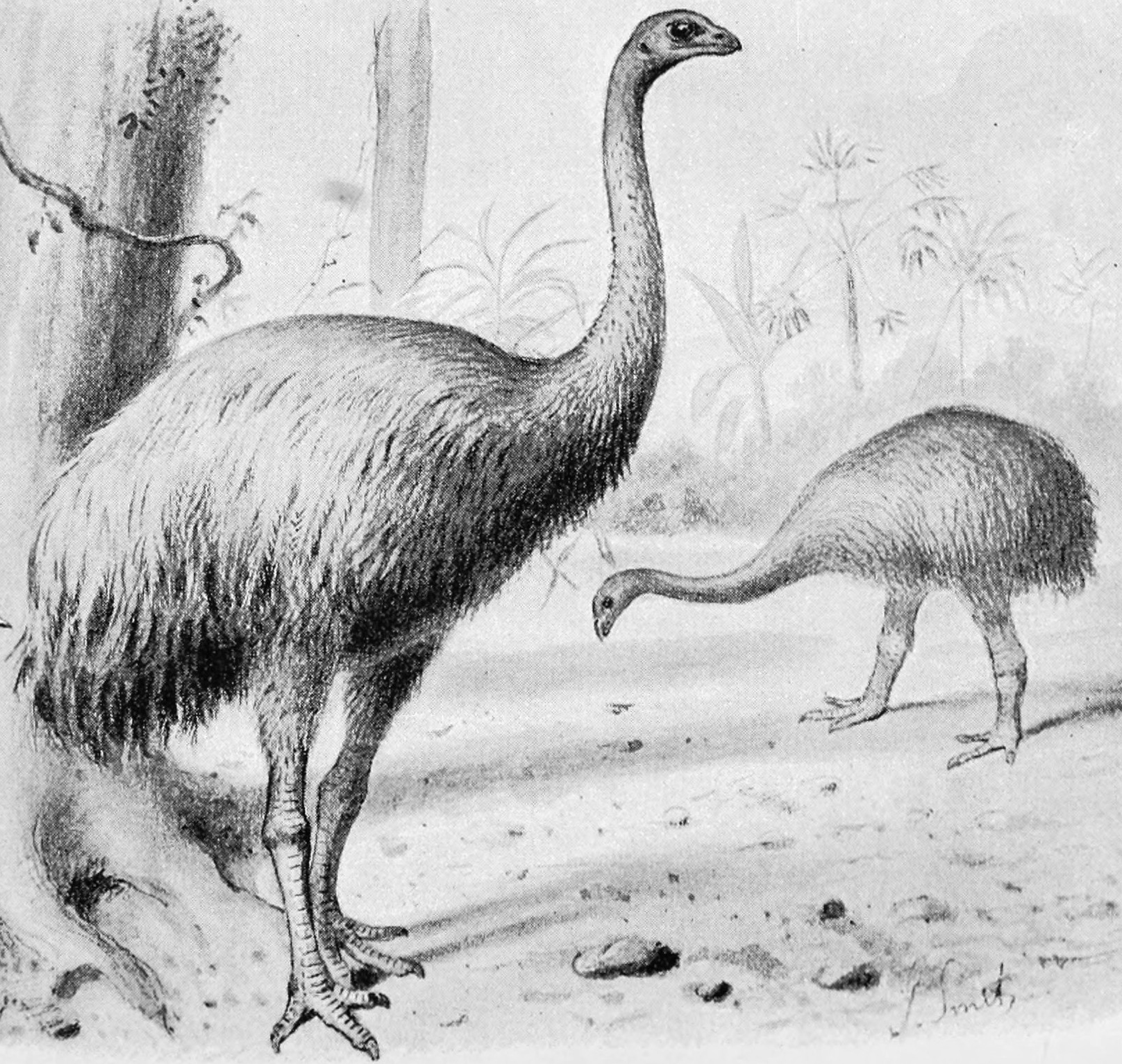
Restoration

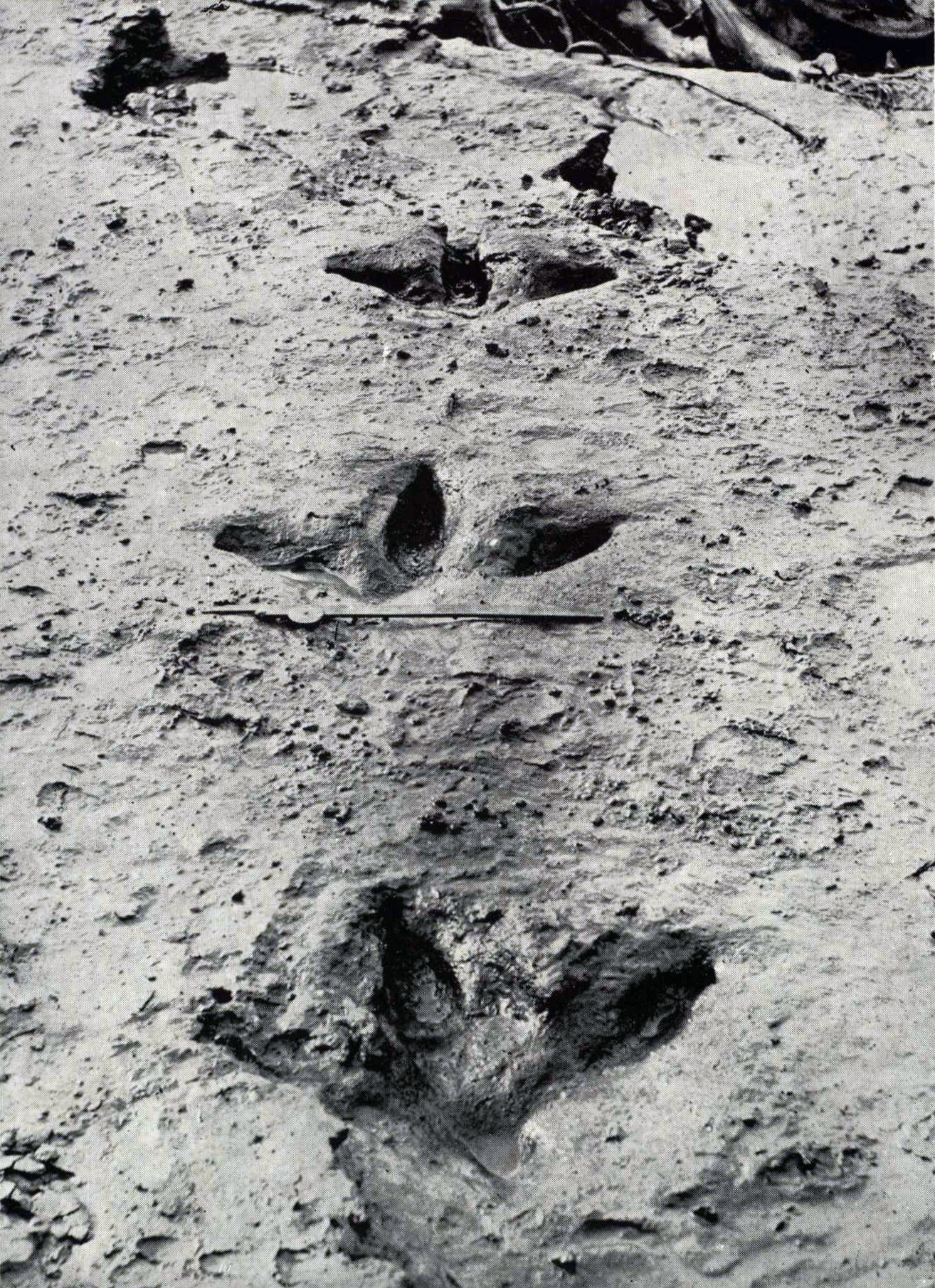
Track-way

== Other sources ==
- Brands, Sheila (14 August 2008). "classification, genus Dinornis". Project: The Taxonomicon (taxonomy.nl). Systema Naturae 2000.
