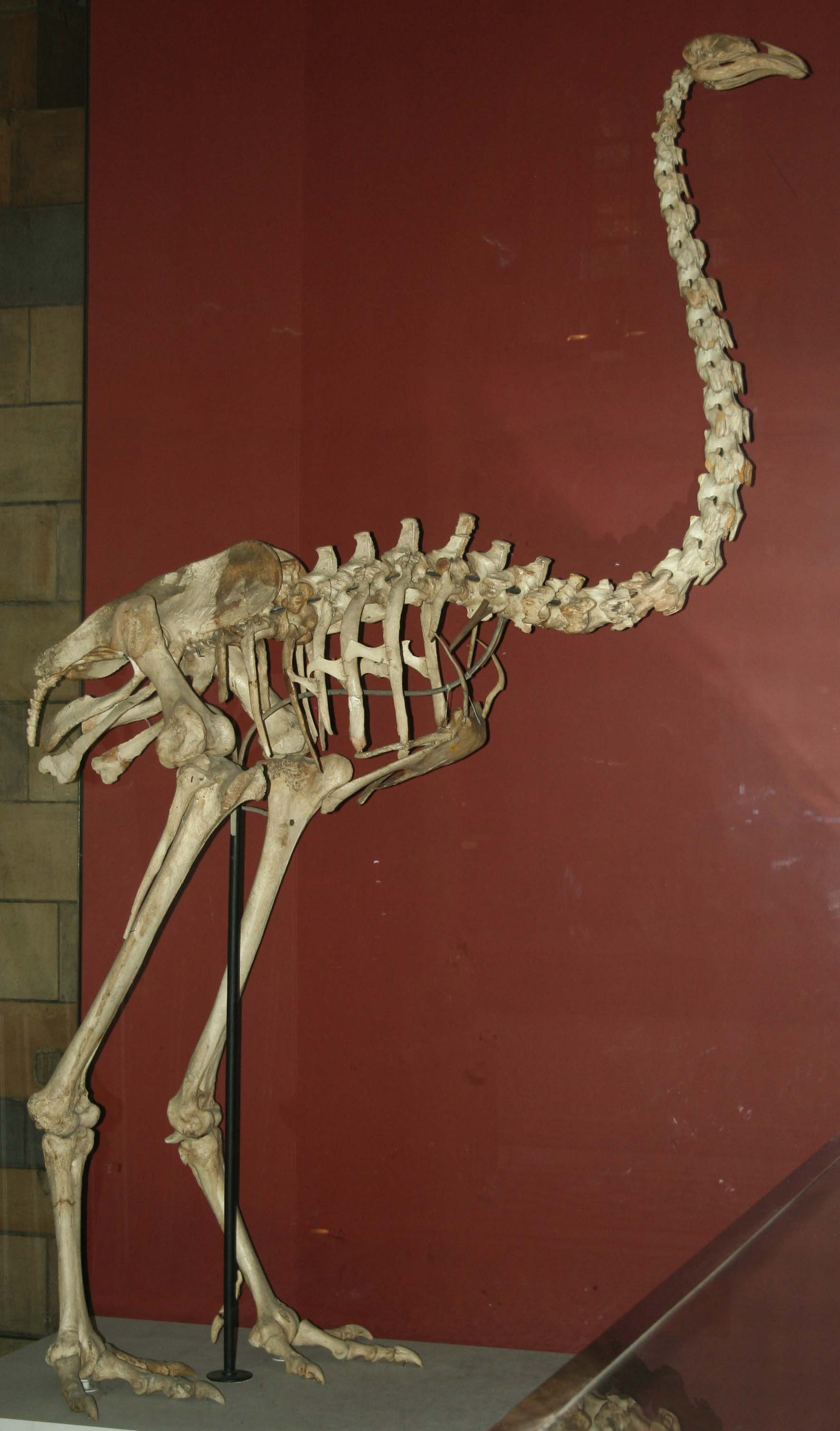
- Skeleton, Natural History Museum of London

Conservation status
- Extinct

Scientific classification
- Kingdom: Animalia
- Phylum: Chordata
- Class: Aves
- Infraclass: Palaeognathae
- Order: †Dinornithiformes
- Family: †Dinornithidae
- Genus: †Dinornis
- Species: †D. novaezealandiae

Binomial name
- †Dinornis novaezealandiae Owen, 1843

Synonyms
- List: Dinornis giganteus Owen, 1844; Dinornis struthoides Owen, 1844; Owenia struthoides (Gray 1855); Dinornis ingens Owen, 1844; Dinornis gigas Owen, 1846 spelling lapse; Moa ingens (Owen 1844) Reichenbach, 1850; Movia ingens (Owen 1844) Reichenbach, 1850; Dinornis gracilis Owen, 1855; Dinornis dromioides Oliver 1930 non Owen 1846; Dinornis hercules Oliver 1949; Dinornis gazella Oliver 1949; Dinornis excelsus Hutton, 1891; Dinornis firmus Hutton, 1891; Tylopteryx struthoides (Owen 1844) Hutton, 1891; Palapteryx ingens (Owen 1844) Haast 1869

= North Island giant moa =

North Island giant moa Temporal range: Late Pleistocene– Holocene

Extinct species of bird

The North Island giant moa (Dinornis novaezealandiae) is an extinct moa in the genus Dinornis, known in Māori as kuranui. It was a large, herbivorous bird belonging to the order Dinornithiformes, and exhibited a strong sexual dimorphism, with males weighing between 55 and 88 kg and females between 78 and 249 kg. It was one of the tallest birds ever to exist, able to stretch its head to approximately 3 metres.

Dinornis novaezealandiae inhabited the North Island of New Zealand, living in lowland habitats like shrublands, grasslands and forests, fulfilling a role as one of the largest terrestrial herbivores in New Zealand's ecosystem. It is believed to have been primarily herbivorous, although consumption of fungi has also been proposed. They laid large, fragile eggs which were incubated by the males, although the exact method is unknown.

Along with much of the other native fauna, Dinornis novaezealandiae disappeared from New Zealand around the 15th century, roughly 200 years after the Māori first arrived on the islands. It is thought that a number of factors contributed to their extinction, the most notable being overhunting.

== Taxonomy ==
Dinornis novaezealandiae was a ratite and a member of the order Dinornithiformes. The Dinornithiformes were flightless birds that possess a sternum but lack a keel. They also had a distinctive palate.

The cladogram below follows a 2009 analysis by Bunce et al.:

- Dinornithiformes
  - - Megalapteryidae
      - Megalapteryx didinus
    - Dinornithidae
      - Dinornis
        - D. robustus
        - D. novaezealandiae
  - Emeidae
    - Pachyornis
      - P. australis
      - - P. elephantopus
        - P. geranoides
    - - Anomalopteryx didiformis
      - - Emeus crassus
        - Euryapteryx curtus

=== Origin ===
It is believed that ratites, the flightless group of paleognaths to which Dinornis belongs, would have been able to fly. Fossil evidence points to these early flying ratites originating in the Northern Hemisphere, after which they migrated into the Southern Hemisphere and dispersed and diversified there. This migration of flying ancestors is believed to be the cause of the wide distribution of the flightless ratites across the Southern Hemisphere.

== Description ==
Dinornis novaezealandiae has been described as a bird that was "two-legged, tailless, wingless [and] clad in woolly fibres". It had "long, shaggy, hair-like feathers up to 18 cm long". Preserved feathers and skin fragments indicate that all but the legs were fully feathered and that the wings of this bird would not have been visible in life. Their feathers were brown, sometimes with pale edging.

=== Anatomy ===
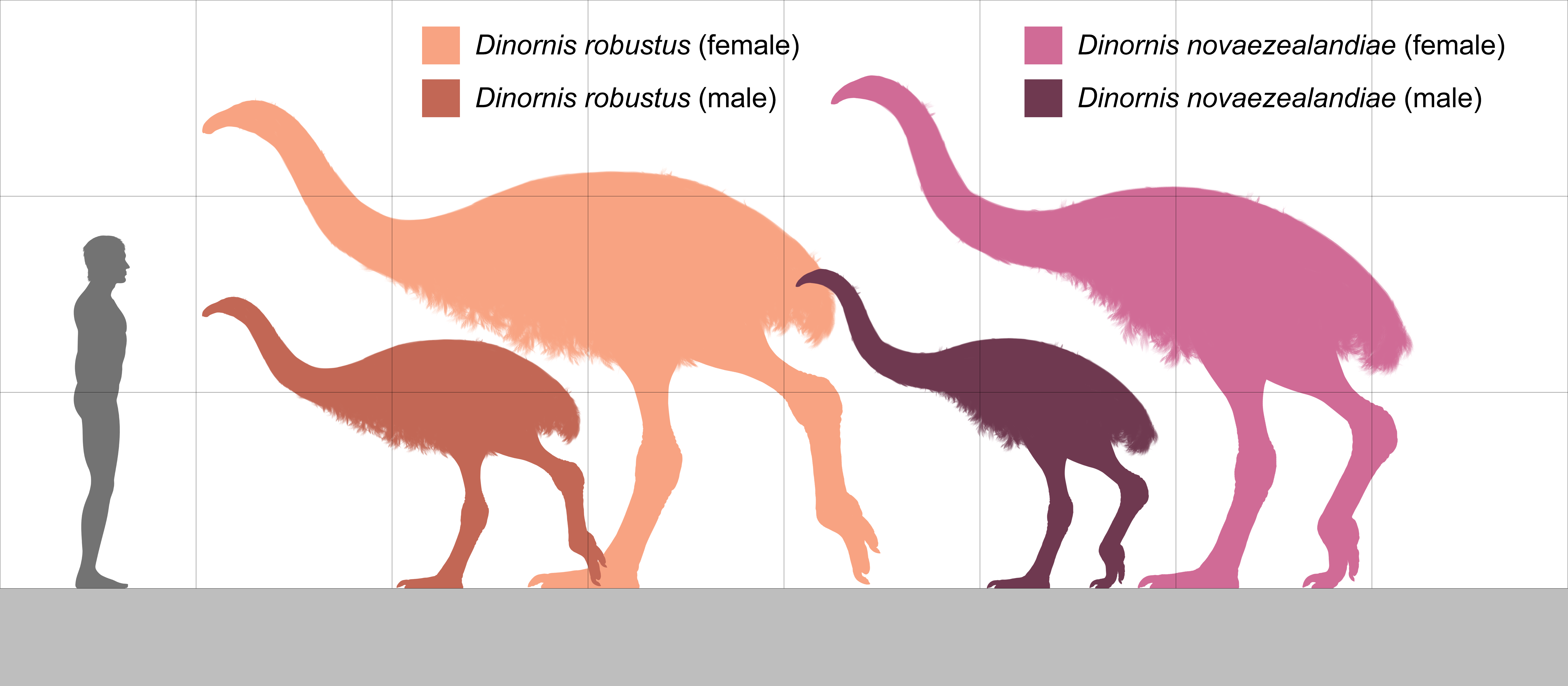
Size diagram of Dinornis species, showing strong sexual dimorphism between smaller males and larger females

Fossils of D. novaezealandiae display a large reversed sexual dimorphism where the females are much larger than males, estimated to have weighed nearly double. Using algorithms derived from data in the bones of juvenile Dinornis, an adult male has been estimated to weigh between 55 and 88 kg, whilst females have been estimated to weigh between 78 and 249 kg. Dinornis had long, slim bones compared to other moa species. The growth and development of Dinornis long bones has been found to be much slower compared to that of other ratites such as the Ostrich. The North Island brown kiwi, that does not reach adult body mass until 12 months, is viewed as a more appropriate developmental analog for the Dinornis due to the similarities that have been drawn between the time taken to reach complete maturity of hindlimbs (5 years), as well as the time upon which tarsals commence fusion with adjacent long bones (4 years).

Even though it might have walked with a lowered posture, standing upright, it would have been the tallest bird ever to exist, able to stretch its head to a height of up to 3 m.

Measurements

North Island
Length	♂	240 cm (94 in)
	♀	300 cm (120 in)
Weight	♂	34–85 kg (75–190 lb)
	♀	76–242 kg (170–530 lb)

== Habitat ==
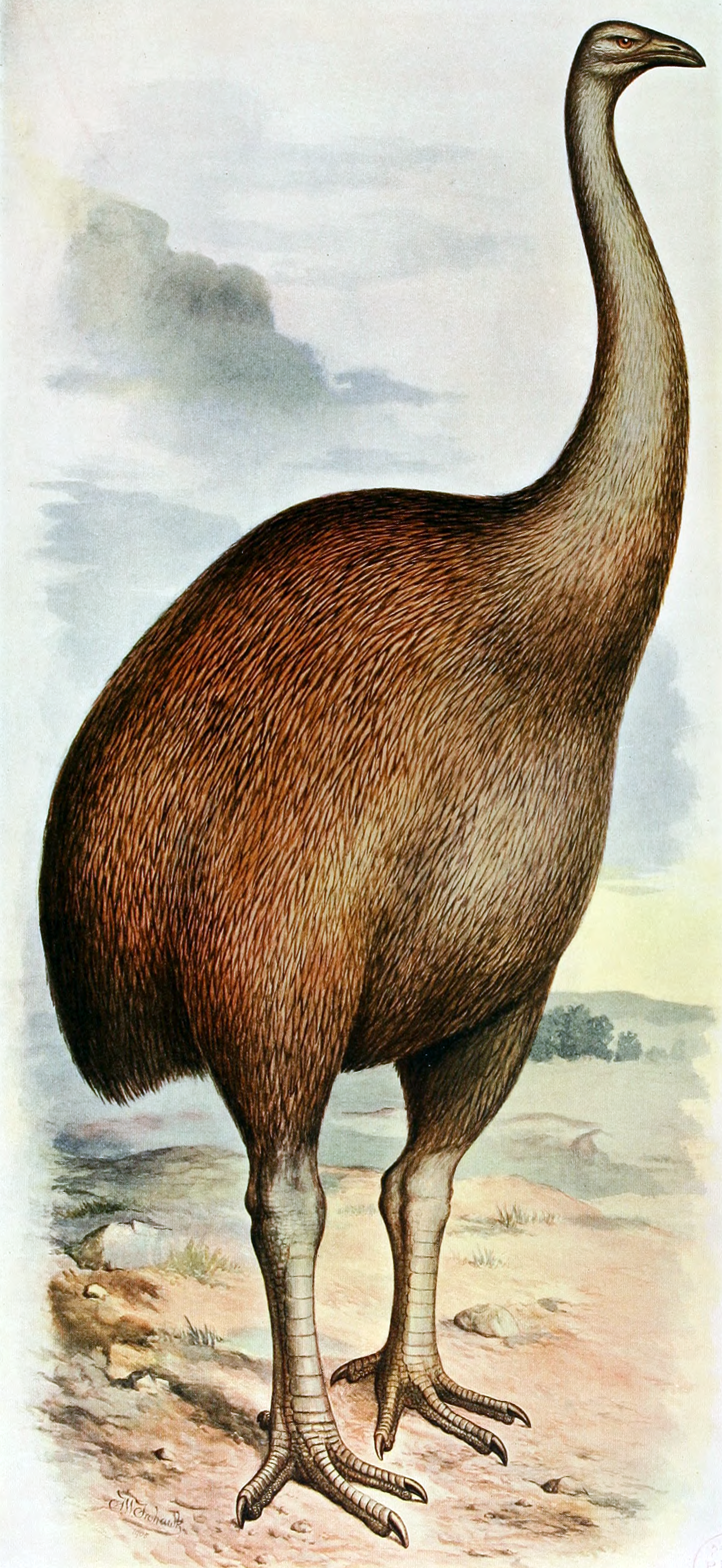
1907 restoration by Frederick Frohawk

Dinornis was a widely represented genus of moa in the North Island of New Zealand, inhabiting lowland habitats like shrublands, grasslands, dunelands, and forests. The habitat of the animal is thought to have remained relatively unchanged for hundreds of thousands of years, in part due to the bird's inability to fly, although habitat shifts have been noted both during times of changing climate and vegetative zones and in reaction to the influence of anthropogenic factors such as the introduction of Polynesian rat (Rattus exulans) and Polynesian dog (Canis familiaris). Later, the human environmental impact of fires made by the Māori people also contributed to habitat alterations.

Based on recent knowledge, the Kahikatea-Pukatea-tawa forest, Waikato, was home to the majority of the D. novaezealandiae population. However, bone discoveries also reveal it to have inhabited nearby areas, such as Opito, Auckland, where it was the predominant genus of moa.

== Behaviour and ecology ==
New Zealand plants and moa were in co-evolution. Moa have been found to filiramulate growth habit in plants such as divarication, heteroblasty, deciduousness, spines or spine like structures (enlarged stinging hairs), leaf loss and photosynthetic stems, mimicry and reduced visual apparency, tough and fibrous leaves, distasteful compounds and low nutrient status. Though moa ate flowers, it is unlikely that they contributed to pollination processes. On the contrary, this would have been a more destructive process than other impacts Dinornis novaezealandiae may have had on the North Island's ecology. The deep, longstanding interconnectedness between plants and moa means that the consequences of the extinction of D. novaezealandiae may still be largely unknown.

=== Diet ===
Dinornis novaezealandie was one of the largest herbivores in New Zealand's terrestrial ecosystem. Their diet is described as diverse, consuming a wide range of plant taxa. It is difficult to be certain of the exact diet that this species of moa would have eaten, as coprolites and gizzard content for this species of moa have not yet been found. However, studies propose that their diet would have been similar to that of the closely related Dinornis robustus, from the South Island of New Zealand, due to the similarities in morphology and the landscapes in which they roamed. This would suggest that, like D. robustus, the diet of D. novaezealandiae would have consisted of forest trees, especially Southern Beech (Nothofagaceae), seeds and leaves of small shrubs in forest areas. It is speculated that they might have grazed on herbs in non-forest areas. With such a diverse range of plants restricted to the North Island, if coprolites and gizzard content for D. novaezealandiae are found, this would likely expand the number of plant taxa known to have been eaten by moa. Research into moa beak shapes and jaw muscle size provides some evidence for the diverse diets of moa, and from such research it has been found that large Dinornis browsed primarily on coarse twigs. Further speculation suggests that moa such as D. novaezealandiae may have evolved to have long intestines in order to ferment their plant-based diet, in accordance with their large body size.

Due to the Dinornis' longstanding prevalence in New Zealand's landscape, they would have come to fill certain roles in New Zealand's ecology. One example that has been proposed is them possibly acting as spore dispersers, stemming from findings in moa specimen examinations that show different species of fungi that moa ingested, such as Cortinarius, which is associated with spore dispersal by birds.

=== Dung ===
It has been suggested that that moa defecation and their herbivorous diet may have contributed to nutrient spreading and cycling, though this is not easy to validate. However, large dung from Dinornis novaezealandiae would have likely nurtured the existence of dung beetles and dung mosses (Splachnaceae) on the North Island. Some of the dung mosses may have included those of the Tayloria genus.

=== Tracks ===
The enormous, flightless birds cleared large paths through the landscape. It was observed in the Poukawa region that these would often lead to freshwater springs and the bottom of rocky cliffs; where they would tend to nest and roost. Once this observation was made these paths became particularly useful for humans when searching for fresh water sources and would continue to be used for these purposes long after the moa's extinction.

=== Reproduction ===
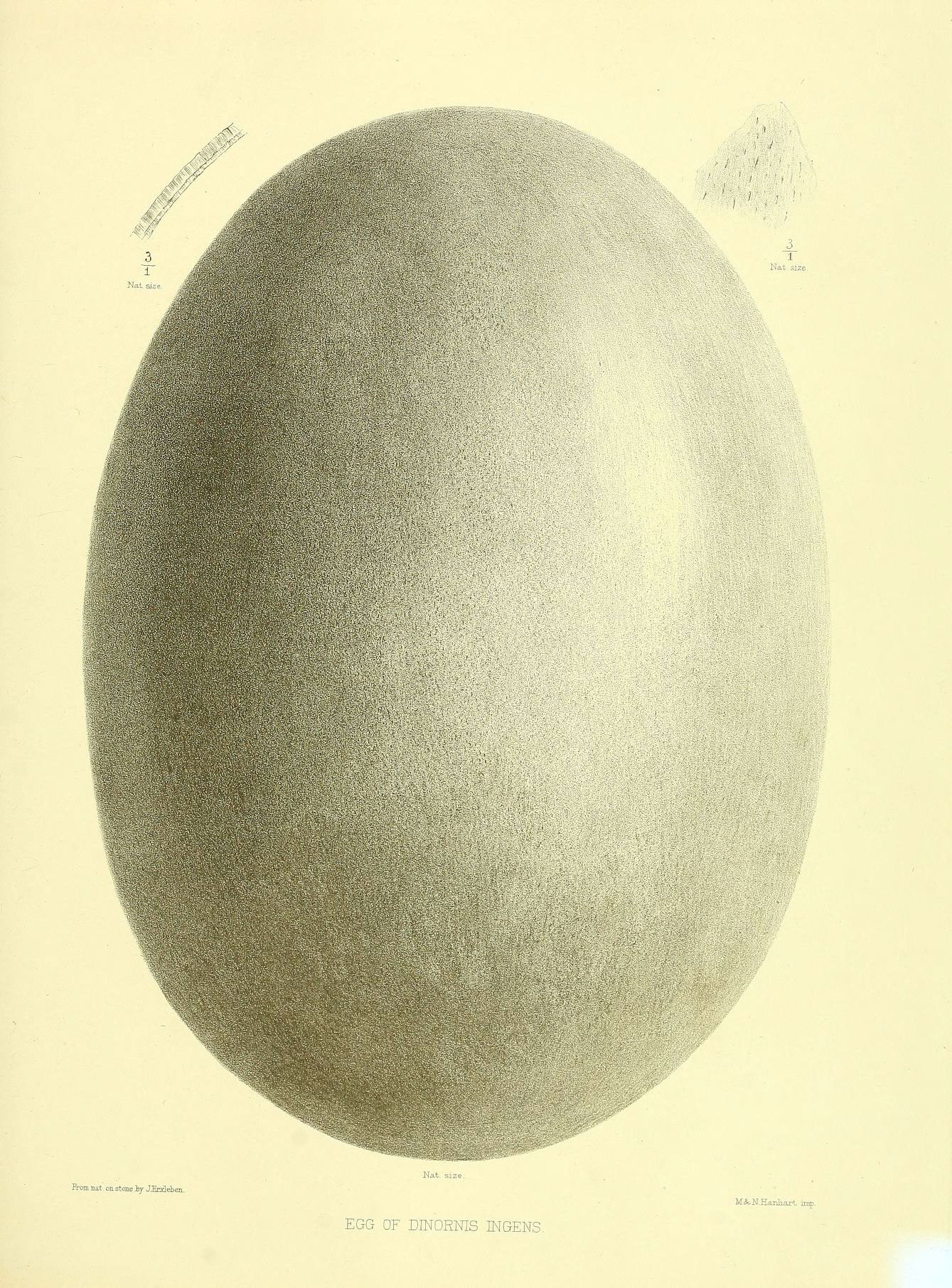
Image of Dinornis egg

Whole moa eggs are a rare find, however the abundance of fragments suggest that when fresh, the egg of Dinornis novaezealandiae would have weighed over 3 kg and measured roughly 190 x 150mm. There is a single, largely intact egg (197 x 151 mm) attributed to this species, from a rock shelter in the Mangawhitikau Valley near Waitomo. Analysis of ancient DNA from surfaces of the outer shell of eggs belonging to D, novaezealandiae has only yielded DNA from males. This indicates that the males were the likely incubators of eggs. Findings also show that the inside of these eggs, and the remains on the outer surface, matched female DNA, which is thought to be from the egg laying process.

Though male D. novaezealandiae were lighter than females, questions have been raised as to how birds of such weight, even those that were smaller, could manage to incubate the fragile eggs successfully since the possibility of breakage is many times greater than that of any other bird. For this reason, it is unlikely that larger moa, such as D. novaezealandiae, would have been able to incubate their eggs using the same contact method that is practiced by almost all extant birds. Whilst the exact structure remains unclear, it is more likely they would have formed a special nest that would support their body weight in some way.

== Relationship with humans ==
Some cultural depictions of moa focus on how the moa was best cooked and enjoyed as a food, such as, He koromiko te wahie i taona ai te moa ("The moa was cooked with the wood of the koromiko"). Other depictions, however, focus on the development and fate of their extinction. This is because the moa was used as a metaphor for the Māori people to express fears of their own extinction that developed as illness, disease and deforestation by European settlers posed a severe threat to their survival. This is seen in sayings such as Huna I te huna a te moa ("Hidden as the moa hid") and "Dead as the Moa", as well as depictions of moa whereby Māori describe it as "having a human face and living in a cave,".

Even though Dinornis novaezealandiae was largely hunted for consumption, findings have also shown that their bones were used to make many one-piece fish-hooks.

Bones of D. novaezealandiae are quite rare, as most of the land surface containing moa bones was lost throughout New Zealand due to extensive land clearance for agriculture during the nineteenth and twentieth century. This means that nowadays the bones are only found in remote, rarely visited sites.

== Extinction ==
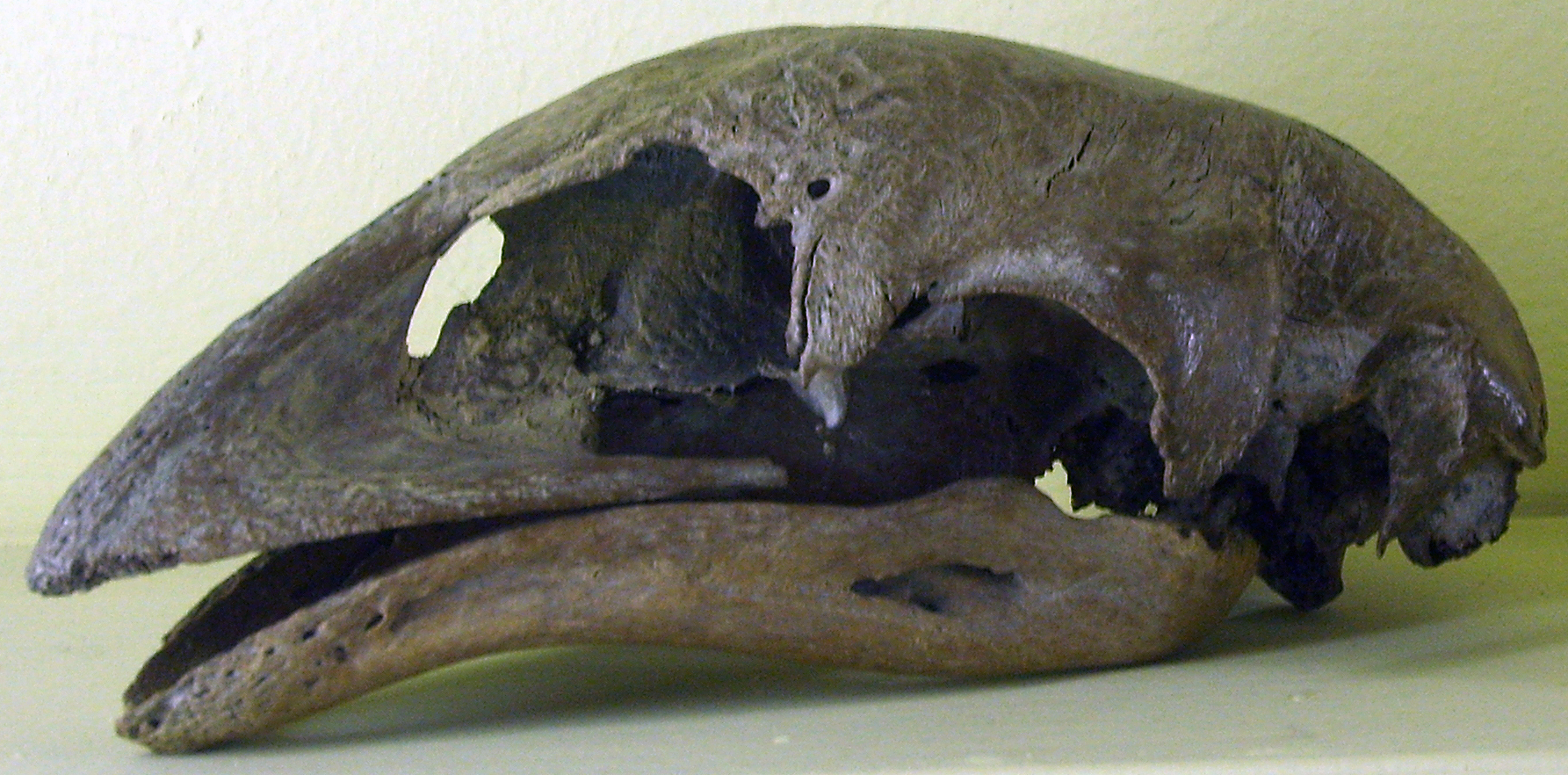
Skull at the Museum für Naturkunde, Berlin

The disappearance and eventual extinction of the moa occurred around the 15th century, 200 years after human settlement of New Zealand. Before the settlement of humans, Dinornis novaezealandiae had few natural predators, meaning there was little threat that the species would become extinct through hunting. However, after the arrival of the Māori people, they soon became a threat to all species of moa, including D. novaezealandiae, as a preferred hunting size has not been found for moa.

Though geographically restricted to the North Island, the diversity of habitat that the moa could survive in has dismantled theories that its extinction could have been a result of habitat loss. Meanwhile, radiocarbon data shows that the vast spread of the highly mobile Māori people across the country, highly correlates with the time upon which moa populations were plummeting. This was the case across all geographical areas, not just those that were being deforested, but also other areas where human activities, such as hunting, were carried out. Though human settlement and hunting activities played the most significant role, there are some other factors that may have inhibited D. novaezealandiae from reproducing at the rate that they were being culled, such as the introduction of Polynesian dogs, as they would have eaten moa chicks.
