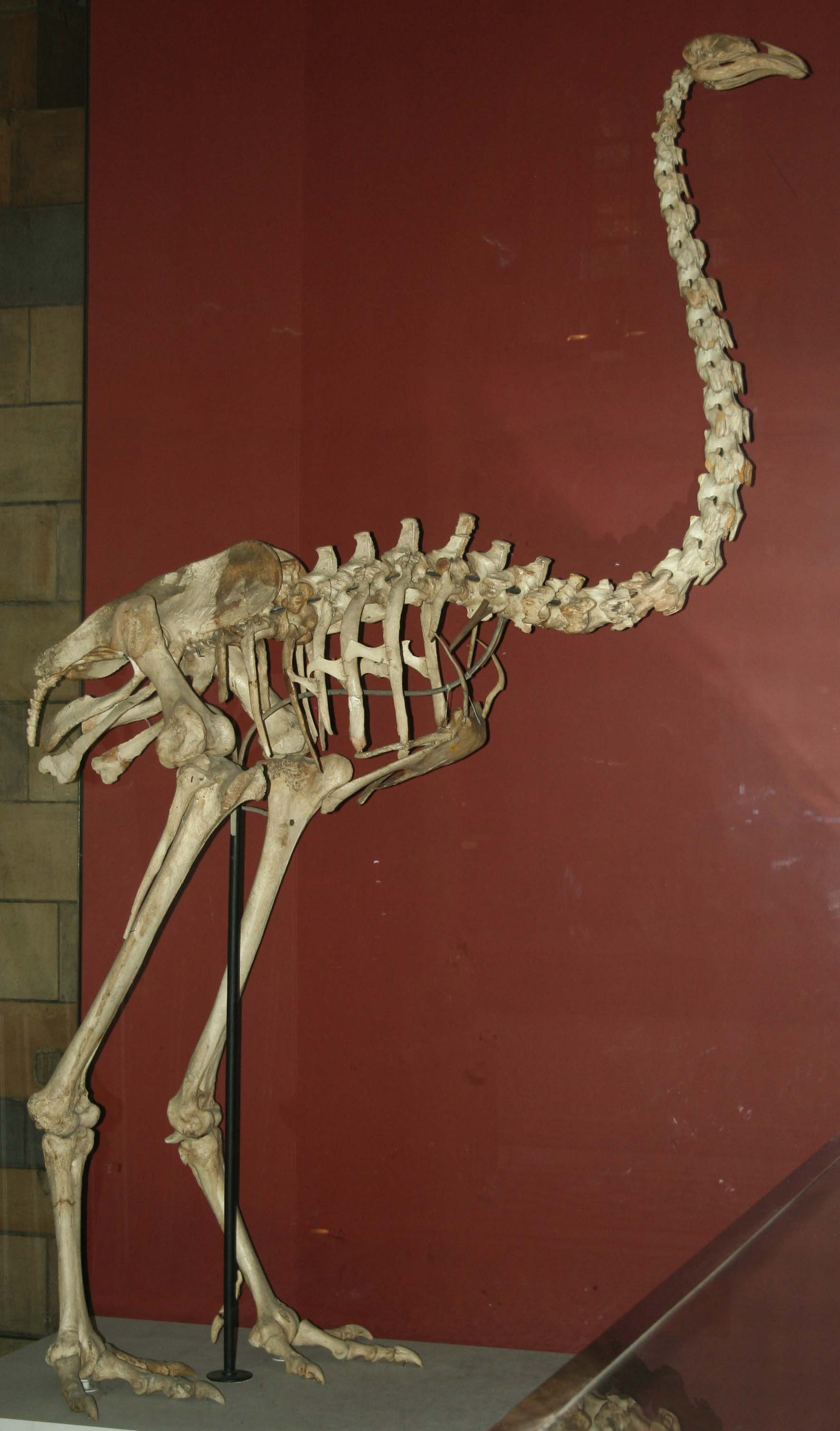
- D. novaezealandiae, Natural History Museum of London

Conservation status
- Extinct (c. 1500)

Scientific classification
- Kingdom: Animalia
- Phylum: Chordata
- Class: Aves
- Infraclass: Palaeognathae
- Order: †Dinornithiformes
- Family: †Dinornithidae
- Genus: †Dinornis; Owen, 1843

Species
- D. novaezealandiae North Island giant moa D. robustus South Island giant moa

Synonyms
- Dinoris (lapsus); Megalornis Owen, 1843 non Gray, 1841: preoccupied, nomen nudum; Moa Reichenbach, 1850; Movia Reichenbach, 1850; Owenia Gray, 1855; Palapteryx Owen, 1851; Tylopteryx Hutton, 1891

= Dinornis =

Dinornis Temporal range: Late Pleistocene-Holocene

Extinct genus of birds

Dinornis (from Ancient Greek δεινός (deinós), meaning "terrible", and ὄρνις (órnis), meaning "bird"), also known as the giant moa, is an extinct genus of birds belonging to the moa family. As with other moa, it is a member of the order Dinornithiformes. It was endemic to New Zealand. Two species of Dinornis are considered valid, the North Island giant moa (Dinornis novaezealandiae) and the South Island giant moa (Dinornis robustus). In addition, two further species (new lineage A and lineage B) have been suggested based on distinct DNA lineages.

== Description ==
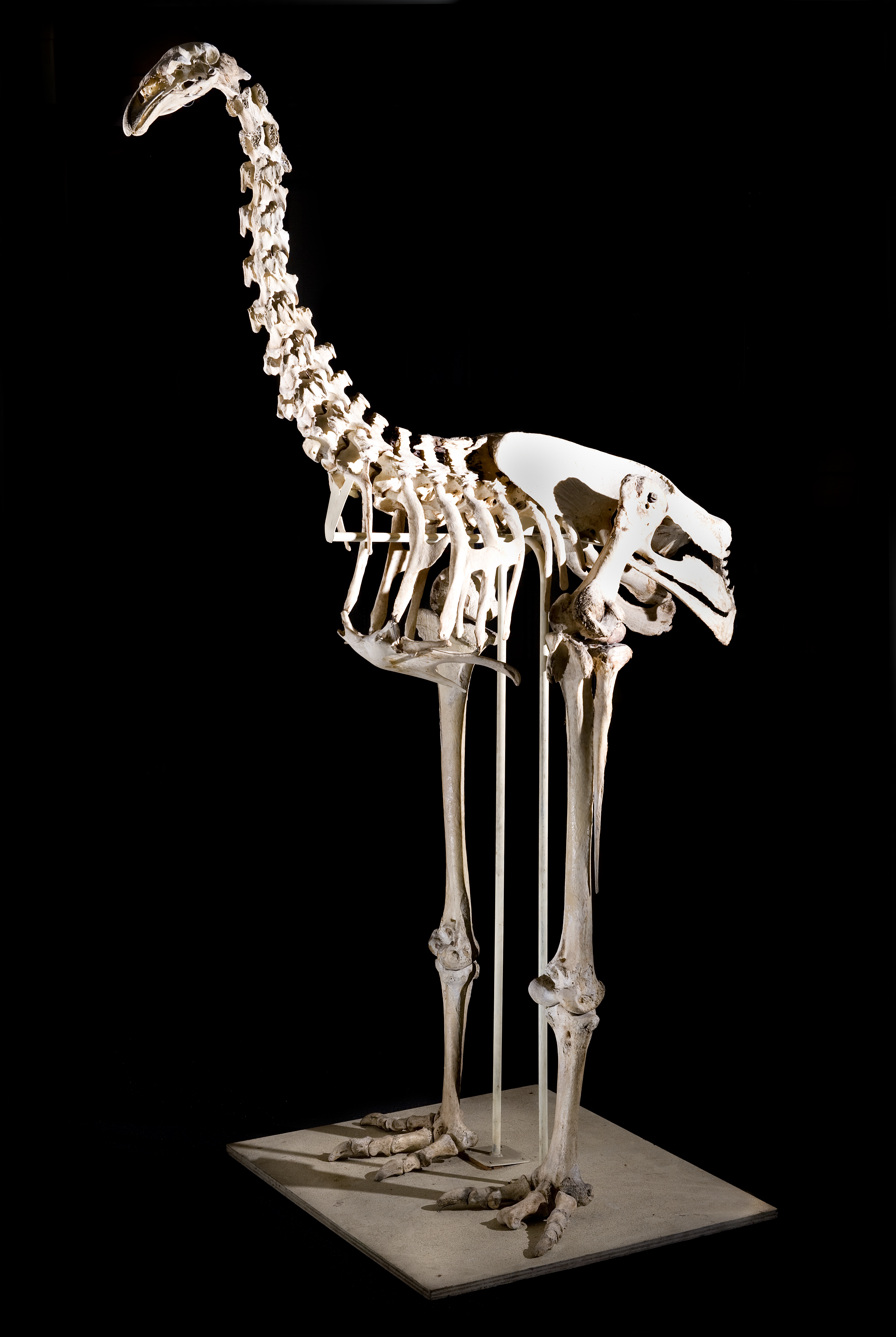
D. robustus skeleton

Dinornis may have been the tallest bird that ever lived, with the females standing around 3.6 m (12 ft) tall, and weighing an estimated 230–240 kg (510–530 lb) or 278 kg (613 lb) in various estimates. However, the males of the genus were much smaller, only around 34–85 kilograms (75–187 lb).

Feather remains are reddish brown and hair-like, and covered most of the body except the lower legs and most of the head (plus a small portion of the neck below the head). While no feathers have been found from moa chicks, it is likely that they were speckled or striped to camouflage them from Haast's Eagles.

The feet were large and powerful, and could probably deliver a powerful kick if threatened. The birds had long, strong necks and broad sharp beaks that would have allowed them to eat vegetation from subalpine herbs through to tree branches. In relation to its body, the head was small, with a pointed, short, flat and somewhat curved beak.

The North Island giant moa tended to be larger than the South Island giant moa.

== Taxonomy ==
The cladogram below follows a 2009 analysis by Bunce and colleagues:

- Dinornithiformes
  - - Megalapteryidae
      - Megalapteryx didinus
    - Dinornithidae
      - Dinornis
        - D. robustus
        - D. novaezealandiae
  - Emeidae
    - Pachyornis
      - P. australis
      - - P. elephantopus
        - P. geranoides
    - - Anomalopteryx didiformis
      - - Emeus crassus
        - Euryapteryx curtus

== Palaeobiology ==
=== Sexual dimorphism ===
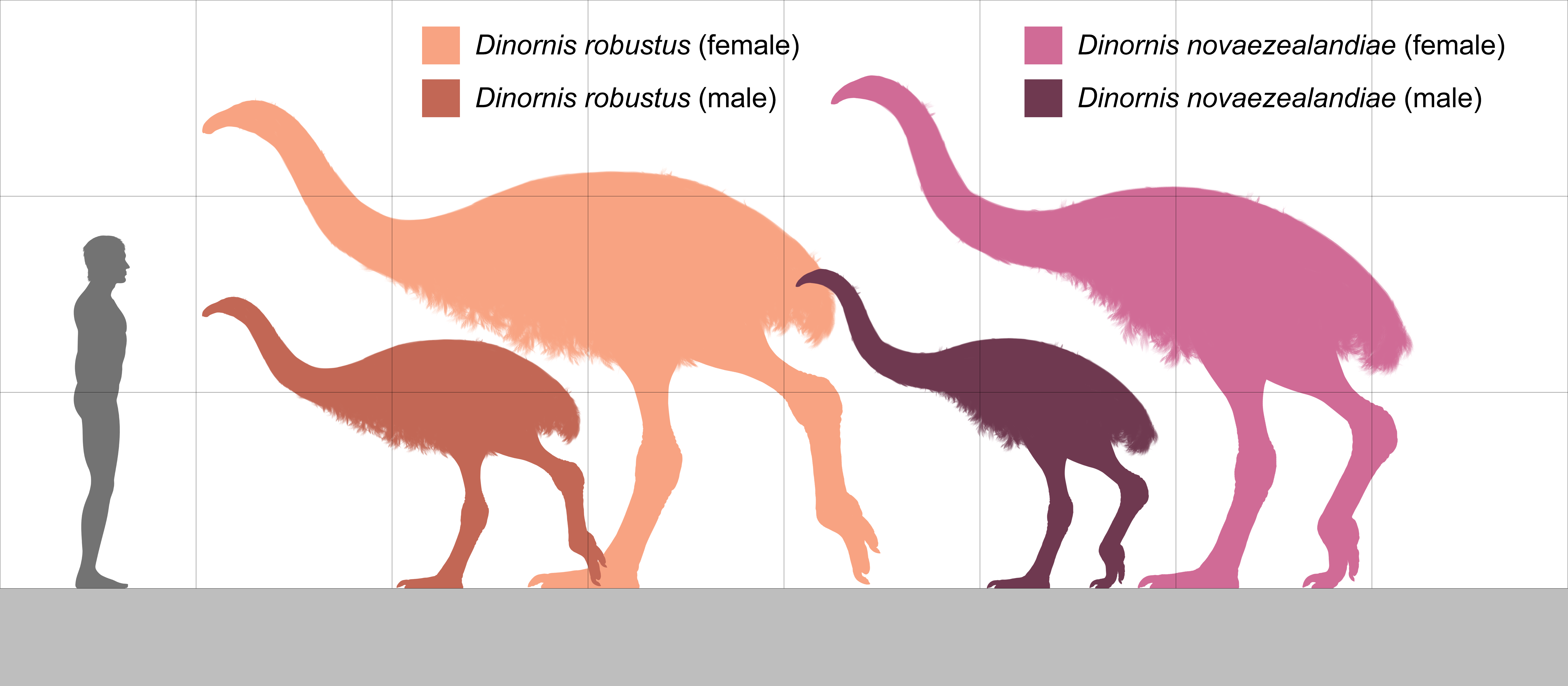
Size dimorphism between two species of Dinornis, showcasing the larger size of females

It has been long suspected that several species of moa constituted males and females, respectively. This has been confirmed by analysis for sex-specific genetic markers of DNA extracted from bone material. For example, prior to 2003 three species of Dinornis were recognised: South Island giant moa (D. robustus), North Island giant moa (D. novaezealandiae) and slender moa (D. struthioides). However, DNA analysis showed that all D. struthioides were in fact males, and all D. robustus were females. Therefore, the three species of Dinornis were reclassified as two species, one each formerly occurring in New Zealand's North Island (D. novaezealandiae) and South Island (D. robustus); However, D. robustus comprises three distinct genetic lineages and may eventually be split into more than one species. Dinornis seems to have had the most pronounced sexual dimorphism of all moa, with females being up to twice as tall and three times as heavy as males.

=== Reproduction ===
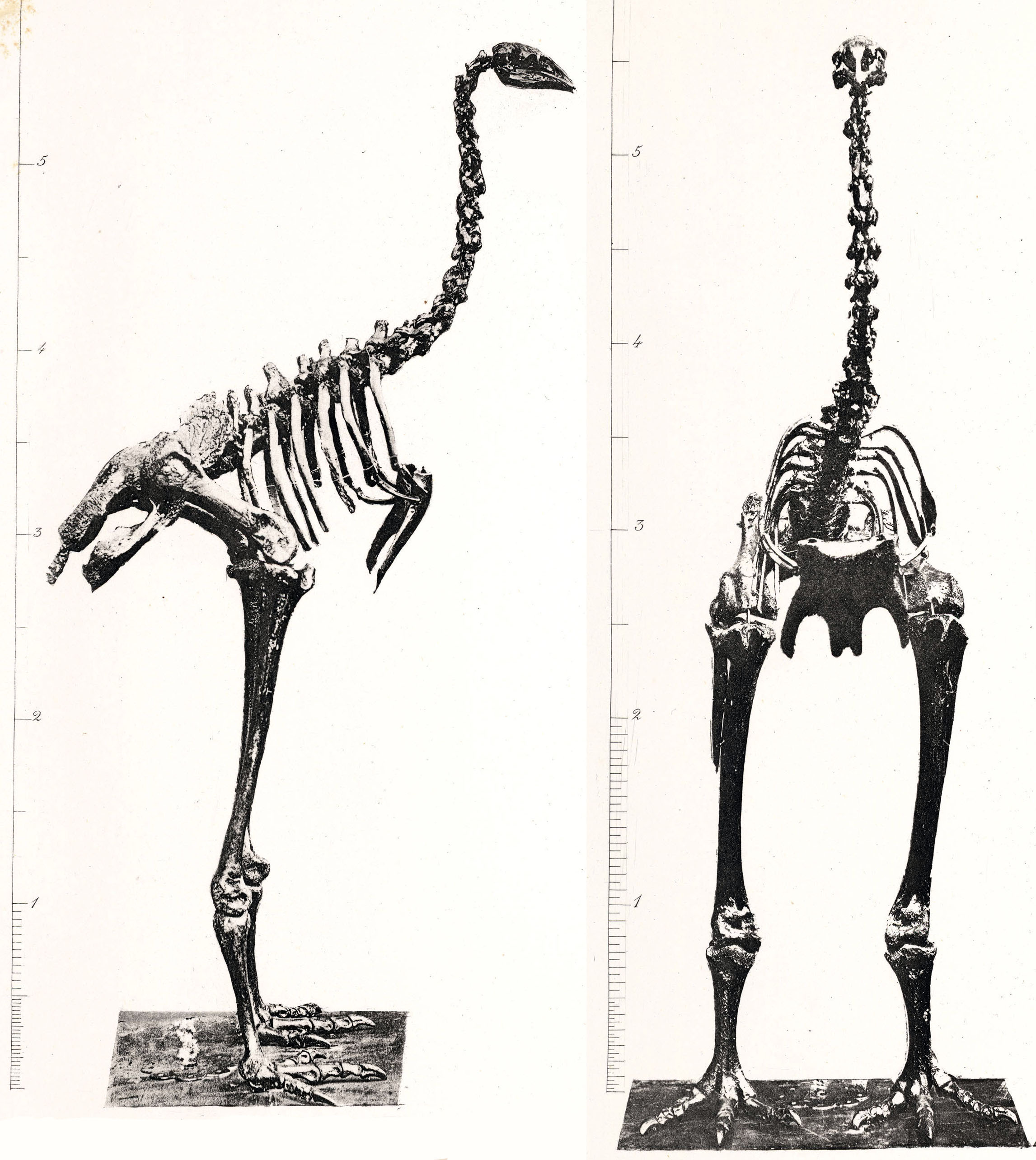
D. struthoides skeleton, now known to be a male D. novaezealandiae, not a distinct species

While it is impossible to know exactly how Dinornis reproduced and raised young, assumptions can be made from extant ratites. The larger females may have competed to mate with the most desirable males who themselves were likely to have been extremely territorial. Eggs may have been laid in communal nests in sand dunes, or by individual birds in sheltered environments such as hollow trees or by rocks. The female would have had little to do with the eggs once they had been laid while the male would have incubated the egg for up to three months before it hatched.

Dinornis eggs were enormous, as large as a rugby ball, and around 80 times the volume of a chicken's egg. The eggs of D. novaezealandiae reached a length and width of 19 centimetres (7.5 in) and 15 centimetres (5.9 in) respectively, while the eggs of Dinornis robustus reached a length and width of 24 centimetres (9.4 in) and 17.8 centimetres (7.0 in), respectively, placing them among the largest bird eggs known, considerably larger than ostrich eggs (the largest living bird eggs), though smaller than those produced by the elephant bird Aepyornis. However, despite their size, Dinornis eggs were extremely thin, with the eggshells of D. novaezealandiae being only around 1.06 millimetres (3/64 in) thick and D. robustus' eggshells being 1.4 millimetres (1/16 in) thick (for contrast, the eggs of Aepyornis are around 3.7 millimetres (9/64 in) thick). As such, Dinornis eggs have been estimated to be the 'most fragile of all avian eggs measured to date'.

It is possible that such fragile eggs resulted in the male moa adapting to become smaller than the females to reduce the risk of crushing the eggs. However, it is possible that the male moa would curl themselves around the eggs rather than sitting on them directly. Given the size of the eggs, and the incubation period, as soon as giant moa chicks hatched they would have been able to see, run and feed themselves.

=== Habitat ===
Dinornis were very adaptable and were present in a wide range of habitats from coastal to alpine. It is possible that individual moa would have moved from environment to environment with the changing seasons.

== Extinction ==
Prior to the arrival of humans, the giant moa had an ecologically stable population in New Zealand for at least 40,000 years. The giant moa, along with other moa genera, were wiped out by Polynesian settlers, who hunted it for food. All taxa in this genus were extinct by the year 1500. It is generally accepted that the Māori still hunted them at the beginning of the 15th century, although some models suggest extinction had already taken place by the middle of the 14th century. Although some birds became extinct due to farming, for which the forests were cut and burned down and the ground was turned into arable land, the giant moa had been extinct for 300 years prior to the arrival of European settlers.
