= D. giganteus =

D. giganteus may refer to:

- Dinornis giganteus, the south island giant moa, an extinct bird species found in New Zealand
- Dyoplosaurus giganteus, a synonym for Tarchia giganteus, an ankylosaurid dinosaur species from the late Cretaceous of Mongolia
