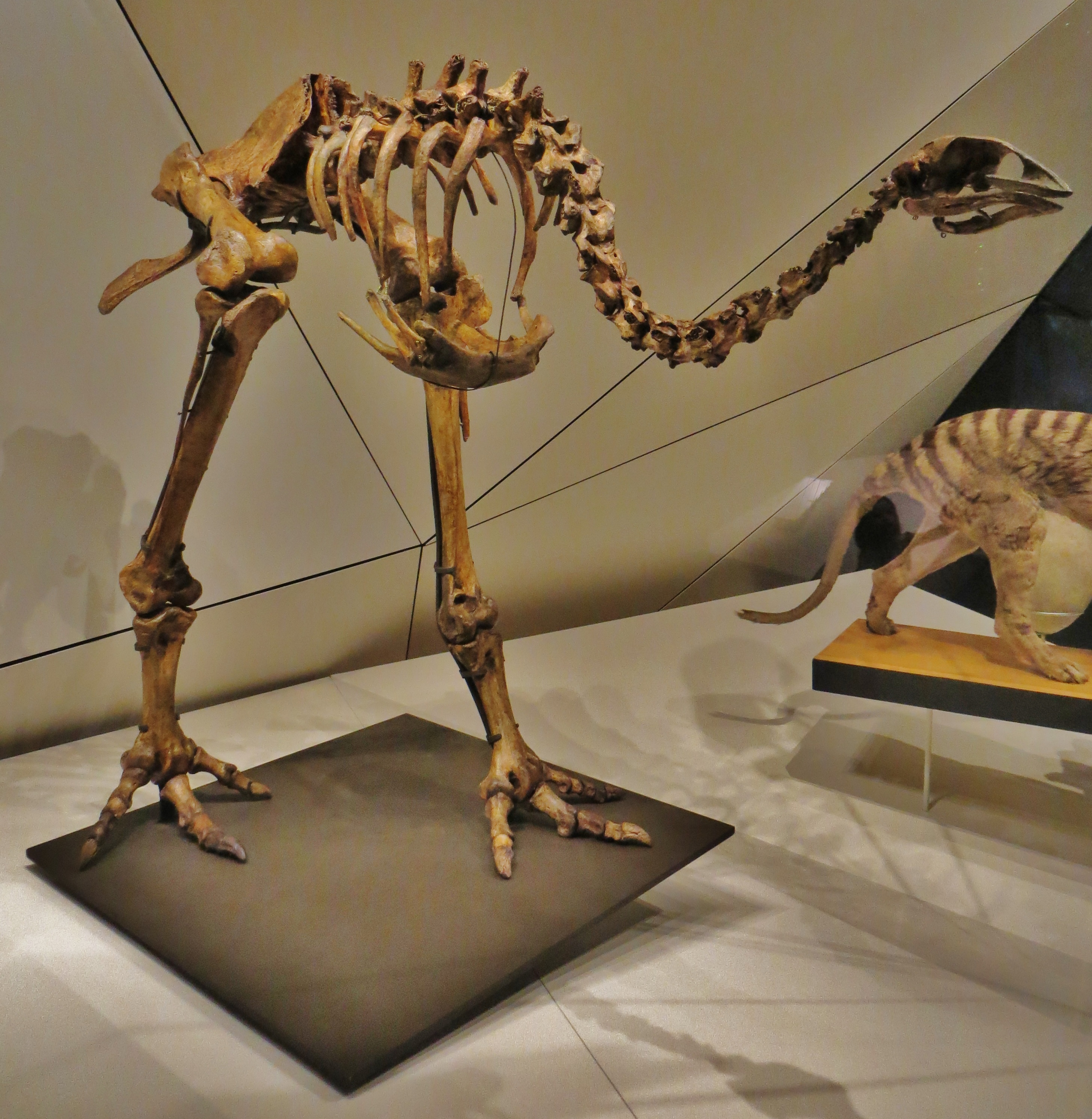
- Skeleton in Musee des Confluences, Lyon

Conservation status
- Extinct (1400s) (NZ TCS)

Scientific classification
- Kingdom: Animalia
- Phylum: Chordata
- Class: Aves
- Infraclass: Palaeognathae
- Order: †Dinornithiformes
- Family: †Emeidae
- Genus: †Emeus; Reichenbach, 1852
- Species: †E. crassus

Binomial name
- †Emeus crassus (Owen, 1846) Reichenbach 1853 non Parker 1895

Synonyms
- List: Dinornis crassus Owen, 1846; Syornis crassus (Owen 1846) Hutton 1891; Euryapteryx crassus (Owen 1846) Hutton 1896 non Benham 1910; Dinornis casuarinus Owen, 1846; Dinornis huttonii Owen, 1846 (male); Emeus huttonii (Owen 1879) Oliver, 1930; Megalapteryx huttoni (Owen 1879) Rothschild 1907; Dinornis major (Hutton, 1875); Dinornis rheides (Owen, 1851); Cela rheides (Owen 1850) Rothschild 1907; Dinornis casuarinus Oliver 1846; Emeus casuarinus (Oliver, 1930); Syornis casuarinus (Owen 1846) bach 1850; Anomalopteryx casuarina (Owen 1846) Lydekker 1891; Mesopteryx casuarina (Owen 1846) Parker 1895; Meionornis casuarinus (Owen 1846) Hutton 1896; Cela casuarinus (Owen 1846) Rothschild 1907; Mesopteryx didina Hutton 1893 non Dinornis didinus Owen 1883; Meionornis didinus (Hutton 1893) Hutton 1896 non Dinornis didinus Owen 1883; Meionornis Haast, 1874; Mesopteryx Hutton, 1891; Syornis Reichenbach, 1850

= Eastern moa =

Eastern moa Temporal range: Pleistocene-Holocene

Extinct species of bird

The eastern moa (Emeus crassus) is an extinct species of moa that was endemic to New Zealand. It is the only species in the genus Emeus.

== Taxonomy ==
When the first specimens were originally described by Richard Owen in 1846, they were placed within the genus Dinornis as three different species. These remains would later be split off into their own genus, Emeus. The other two species, E. casuarinus and E. huttonii are currently regarded as junior synonyms of E. crassus, and the genus currently contains this single species. It has been long suspected that the "species" described as Emeus huttonii and E. crassus were males and females, respectively, of a single species. This has been confirmed by analysis for sex-specific genetic markers of DNA extracted from bone material; the females of E. crassus were 15-25% larger than males. This phenomenon — sexual dimorphism — is not uncommon amongst ratites, being also very pronounced in kiwi and the related moa genus Dinornis.

== Description ==
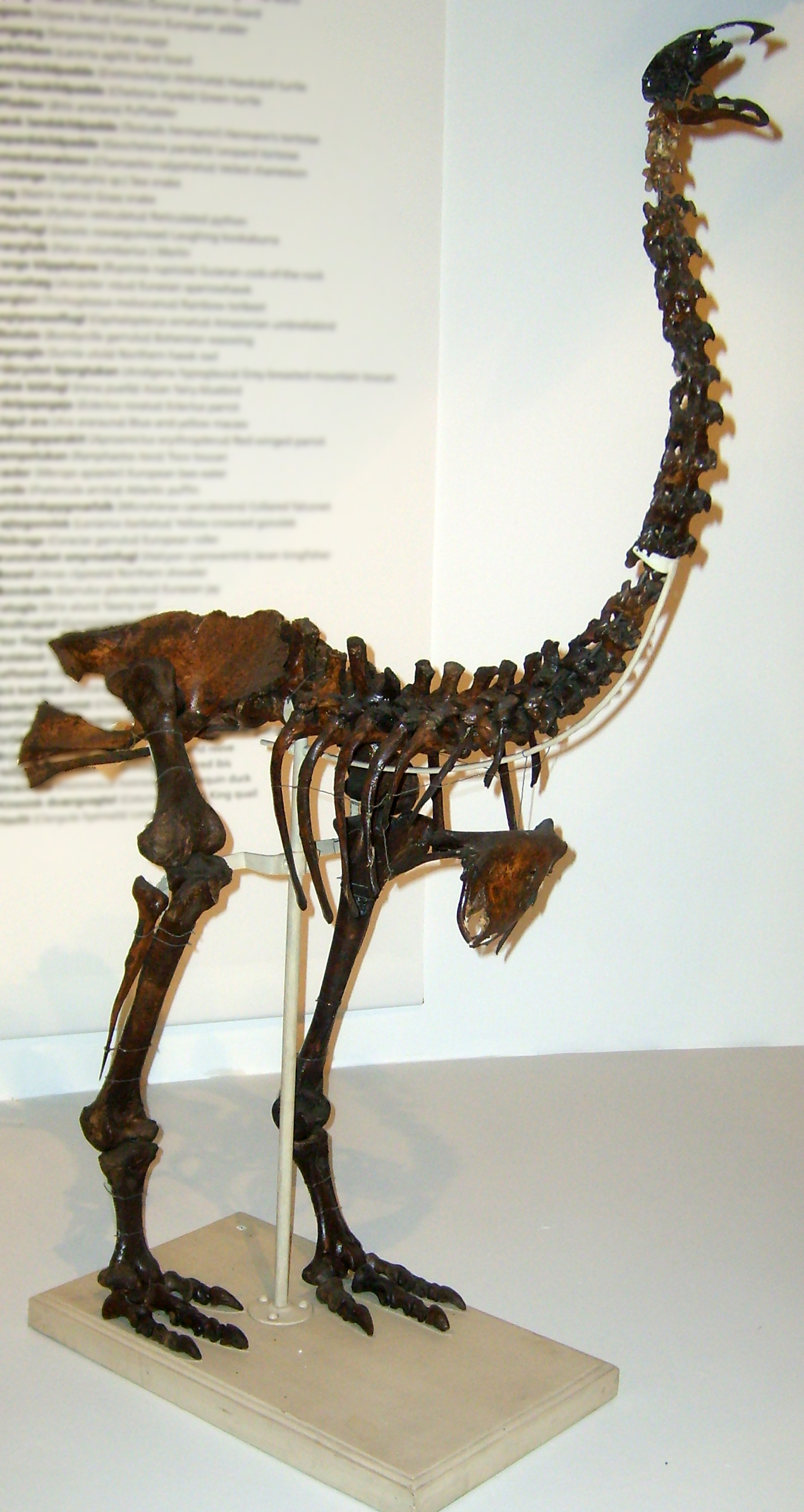
Skeleton in the Copenhagen Zoological Museum

Emeus was of average size, standing 1.5 to 1.8 metres (4.9–5.9 ft) tall, and weighing from 36 to 79kg. Like other moa, it had no vestigial wing bones, hair-like feathers (beige in this case), a long neck and large, powerful legs with very short, strong tarsi. Its tarsometatarsus was restricted in motion to the parasagittal plane, a condition much like that in most other ratites. It also had a sternum without a keel and a distinctive palate. Emeus had pelvic musculature poorly adapted for cursoriality. Its feet were exceptionally wide compared to other moas, making it a very slow creature. Soft parts of its body, such as tracheal rings (cartilage) or remnants of skin have been found in the form of mummified specimens, as well as single bones and complete skeletons. As they neared the head, the feathers grew shorter, until they finally turned into coarse hair-like feathers; the head itself was probably bald. Eggs were 17.9 / 13.4 cm, and weighed 1.9 kg.

== Range and habitat ==
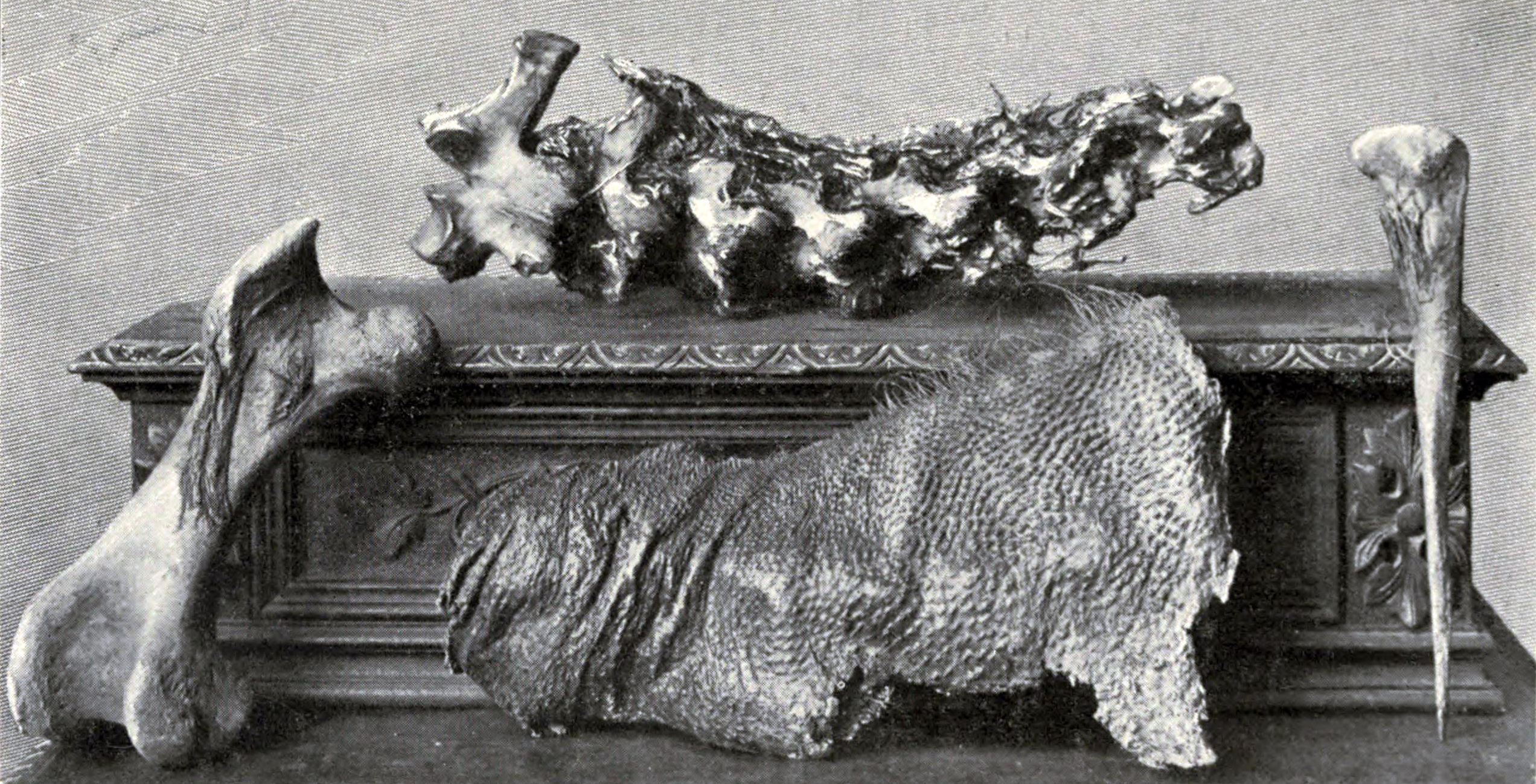
Neck and leg bones with soft tissue

Eastern moa lived only on the South Island of New Zealand, inhabiting lowland habitats like forests, grasslands, dunelands, and shrublands. During the Last Glacial Maximum, it was confined to a single glacial refugium, from which its range expanded during the Holocene. Human colonists (specifically the Māori, who called the animals "moa mōmona") hunted Emeus into extinction with relative ease. E. crassus was the second most common species found at the Wairau Bar site in Marlborough, where the remains of more than 4000 eaten moa were found. The species had gone extinct around the year 1400.
