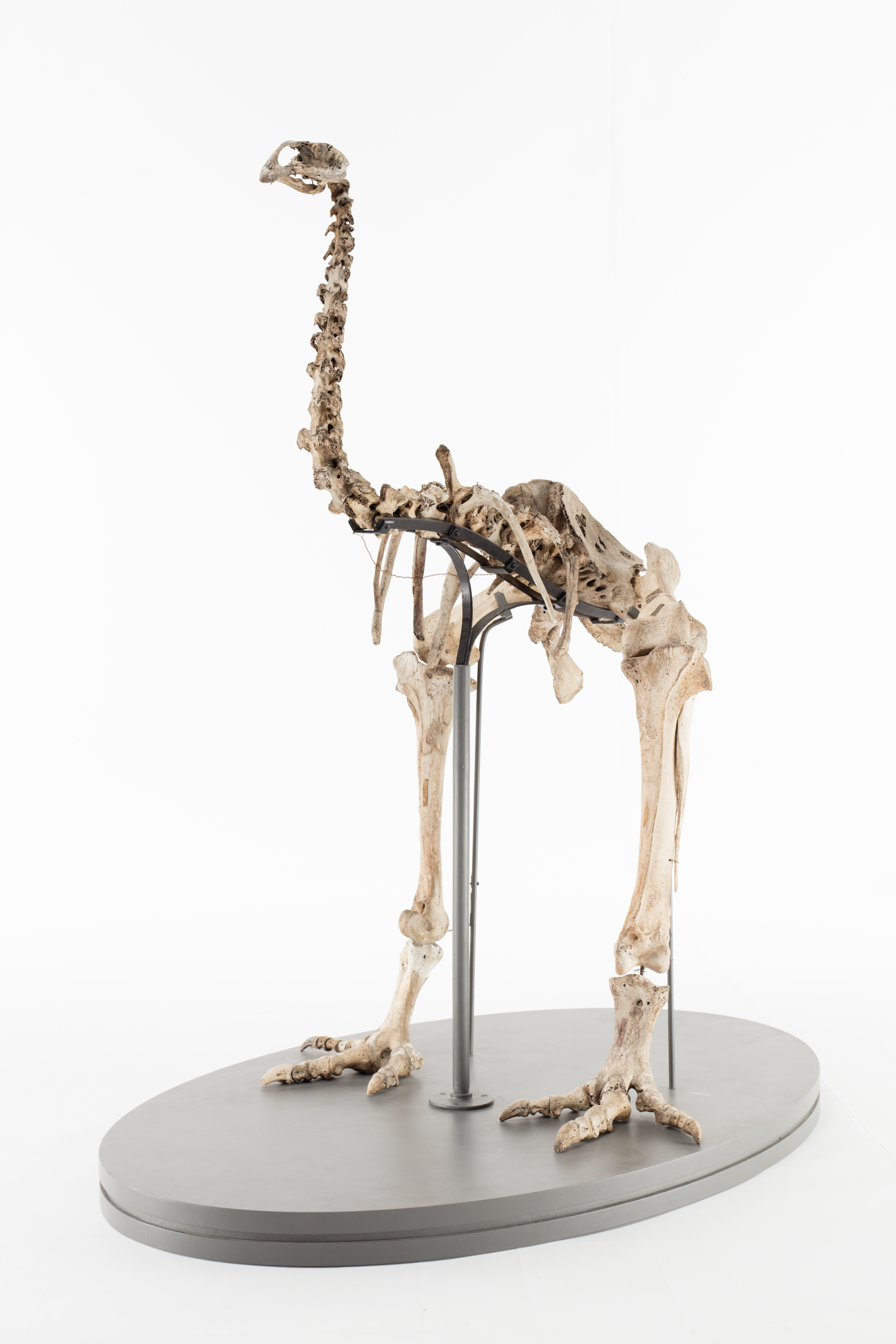
- P. elephantopus skeleton from the Auckland Museum.

Scientific classification
- Kingdom: Animalia
- Phylum: Chordata
- Class: Aves
- Infraclass: Palaeognathae
- Order: †Dinornithiformes
- Family: †Emeidae
- Genus: †Pachyornis
- Species: †P. elephantopus

Binomial name
- †Pachyornis elephantopus (Owen, 1856) Lydekker 1891 non Cracraft 1976

Synonyms
- List: Dinornis elephantopus Owen, 1856; Euryapteryx elephantopus (Owen 1856) Hutton 1892; Dinornis queenslandiae De Vis, 1884; Pachyornis queenslandiae (De Vis 1884) Oliver 1949; Dromiceius queenslandiae (De Vis 1884) Miller 1963; Euryapteryx ponderosus Hutton, 1891 non Hamilton 1898; Pachyornis immanus Lydekker, 1891; Euryapteryx immanis (Lydekker 1891) Lambrecht 1933; Pachyornis inhabilis Hutton, 1893; Pachyornis major Hutton, 1875; Pachyornis rothschildi Lydekker, 1892; Pachyornis valgus Hutton, 1893; Euryapteryx crassa Benham 1910 non (Owen 1846) Hutton 1896; Pachyornis murihiku Oliver 1949

= Heavy-footed moa =

Heavy-footed moa Temporal range: Late Pleistocene-Holocene

Extinct species of bird

The heavy-footed moa (Pachyornis elephantopus), or Moa waewae taumaha (Māori), is an extinct species of moa from the lesser moa family. The heavy-footed moa was widespread across the South Island of New Zealand, and inhabited lowland environments like shrublands, dunelands, grasslands, and forests. Moa are ratites, flightless birds with a sternum without a keel. They also have a distinctive palate.

The heavy-footed moa was about 1.8 m (5 ft 11 in) tall, and weighed as much as 145 kg (320 lb). Three complete or partially complete moa eggs in museum collections are considered eggs of the heavy-footed moa, all sourced from Otago. These eggs have an average length of 226 mm (8.9 in) and a width of 158 mm (6.2 in), making these the second-largest moa eggs, behind the single South Island giant moa egg specimen.

== Taxonomy ==
The heavy-footed moa was originally described as Dinornis elephantopus by the biologist Richard Owen in 1856 from leg bones found by Walter Mantell at Awamoa, near Oamaru, and given by him to the Natural History Museum in London. Bones from multiple birds were used to make a full articulated skeleton.

== Distribution and habitat ==
The heavy-footed moa was found only on the South Island of New Zealand. Their range covered much of the eastern side of the island, with a northern and southern variant of the species. P. elephantopus primarily inhabited lowland environments, preferring dry and open habitats such as grasslands, shrublands and dry forests. They were absent from sub-alpine and mountain habitats, where they were replaced by the crested moa (Pachyornis australis).

During the Pleistocene-Holocene warming event, the retreat of glacial ice meant that the heavy-footed moa's preferred habitat increased in size, allowing their distribution across the island to increase as well.

== Ecology and diet ==
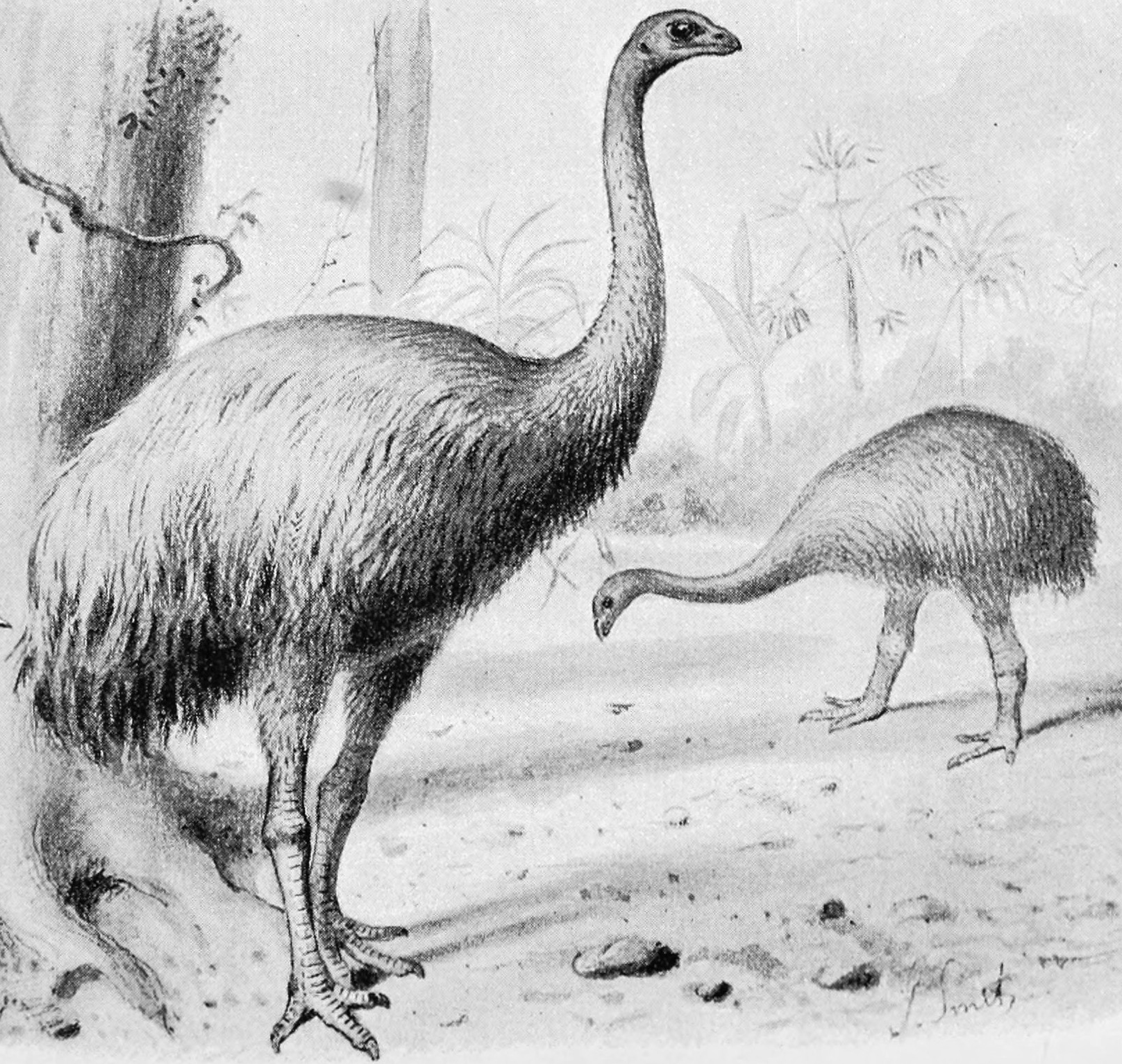
Restoration of Dinornis robustus and P. elephantopus

Due to its relative isolation before the arrival of Polynesian settlers, New Zealand has a unique plant and animal community and, historically, had no native terrestrial mammals. Moa filled the ecological niche of large herbivores, filled by mammals elsewhere, until the arrival of the Polynesian settlers and the associated mammalian invasion in the 13th Century. The heavy-footed moa is thought to have been less common than other moa species, which is backed up by its less frequent occurrence in the fossil record.

Until recently it was unknown what the diet of the heavy-footed moa consisted of, although the fact that it had a differently shaped head and beak when compared to related and contemporary moa species suggested that it had a different diet. It had been hypothesized that this was an adaptation for dealing with tougher vegetation, which would have been more abundant in its preferred dry and shrubby habitat. Specialising in different foods would have also allowed it to avoid competition with other moa species which may have shared part of its range. In 2007, Jamie Wood described the gizzard contents of a heavy-footed moa for the first time. Wood found evidence of 21 plant taxa which included Hebe leaves, various seeds and mosses as well as a large amount of twigs and wood, with some of the recovered fragments being of considerable size. This data supported the hypothesis that the heavy-footed moa was adapted to consume tough vegetation, but it also shows that it had a varied diet and could eat most plant material, including wood.

Before the arrival of humans and non-native placental mammals on New Zealand, the only animal capable of feeding on P. elephantopus would have been Haast's eagle (Hieraaetus moorei). Recent evidence from coprolites shows that the species also hosted several groups of host-specific parasites, including nematode worms.

== Museum specimens ==
An articulated skeleton of a heavy-footed moa from Otago, New Zealand, is on display in the Collectors' Cabinet gallery at Leeds City Museum, UK.
