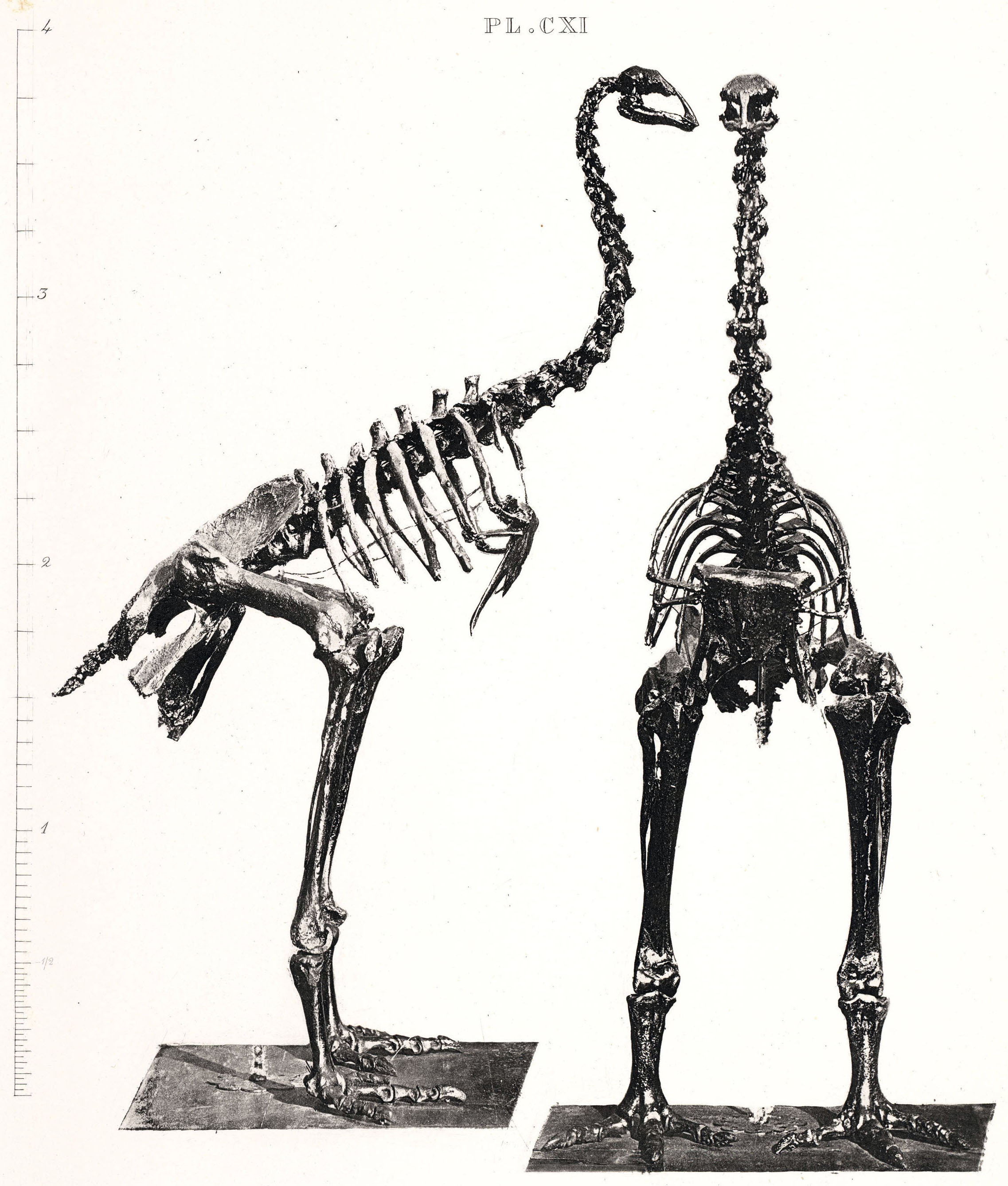
- Skeleton

Conservation status
- Extinct (~1400s) (NZ TCS)

Scientific classification
- Kingdom: Animalia
- Phylum: Chordata
- Class: Aves
- Infraclass: Palaeognathae
- Order: †Dinornithiformes
- Family: †Emeidae
- Genus: †Anomalopteryx; Reichenbach 1852
- Species: †A. didiformis

Binomial name
- †Anomalopteryx didiformis (Owen 1844) Reichenbach 1853

Synonyms
- List: Dinornis didiformis Owen, 1844; Anomalopteryx didiformis (Owen 1844) Lydekker 1891; Anomalornis didiformis (Owen 1844) Hutton 1897; Dinornis dromioides Owen, 1846 non Oliver 1930; Anomalopteryx dromaeoides (Owen 1846) Lydekker 1891; Dinornis parvus Owen, 1883; Anomalopteryx parva (Owen 1883) Lydekker 1891; Dinornis oweni Haast, 1886; Anomalornis owenii (Haast 1886) Hutton 1897; Pachyornis owenii (Haast 1886) Archey 1941; Anomalopteryx oweni (Haast 1886) Oliver 1949; Anomalopteryx antiquusHutton, 1892 (may be a valid predecessor species); Anomalopteryx fortis Hutton, 1893; Anomalornis gracilis Hutton, 1897, non Dinornis gracilis Owen 1854; Anomalornis (Hutton, 1897); Graya (Bonaparte, 1956)

= Bush moa =

Bush moa Temporal range: Pleistocene-Holocene

Extinct genus of flightless birds

The bush moa, little bush moa, or lesser moa (Anomalopteryx didiformis) is an extinct species of moa from the family Emeidae (lesser moa) endemic to New Zealand. It is the only species in the genus Anomalopteryx. Its Māori name is moariki.

== Taxonomy ==
The bush moa was first scientifically described as Dinornis didiformis by Richard Owen in 1844. He chose the specific name didiformis because of the apparent similarity in the shape and size of the bush moas' tarsometatarsus to that of the dodo (then Didus ineptus).

== Description ==
The bush moa is the smallest known species of moa, having only been slightly taller than a turkey (approx. 1.3 metres (51 in) tall). A slender bird, it is estimated to have weighed around 30–49 kilograms (66–108 lb). Eggs were large, longer than an Ostrich egg, measuring 15.2–18 cm in length and 11.5–12.1 cm in width. As with all moa, Anomalopteryx possesses a sternum, but no keel. They also have a distinctive palate. The animal inhabited much of New Zealand's North Island, along with some small sections of the South Island. Its habitat consisted of dense lowland conifer forests, broad-leafed southern beech forests and scrubland. It possessed a sturdy, sharp-edged beak, suggesting that its diet was made up of twigs and other tough plant material. Bush moa coprolites indicate ferns were a crucial food source for them.

== Threats and extinction ==
Native predators included the Haast's eagle and Eyles' harrier. The species went extinct alongside other native New Zealand wildlife around 500-600 years ago, following the arrival and proliferation of the Māori people in New Zealand (who called them "moariki"), as well as the introduction of Polynesian dogs.

== Remains ==
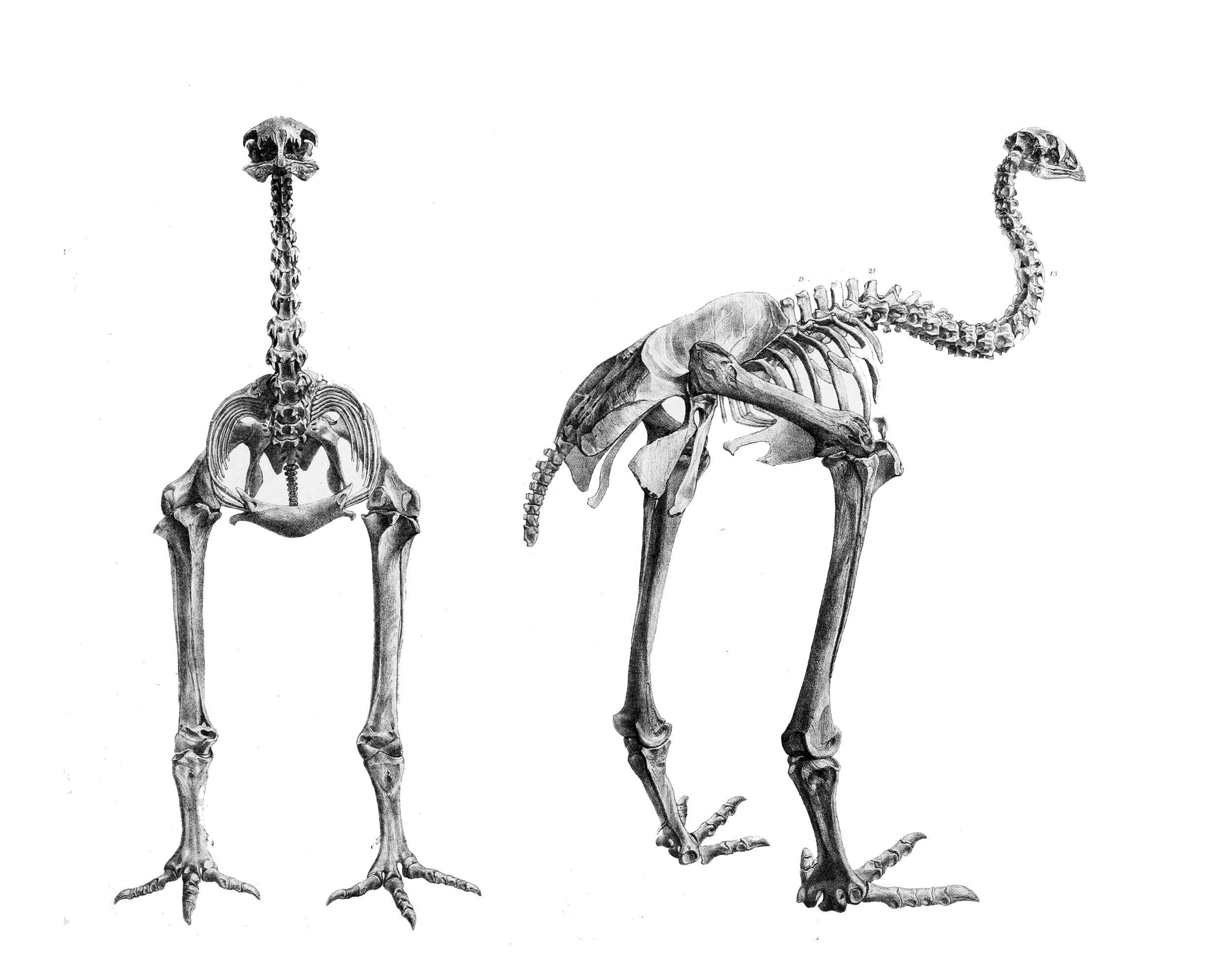
Skeleton

The most complete remains, a partially articulated skeleton with substantial mummified tissue and feathers, were discovered in 1980 in Lake Echo Valley, east of Te Anau, Southland. It is now housed in the Southland Museum and Art Gallery in Invercargill. Anomalopteryx fossils made up the bulk of moa fossils discovered in a swamp in 1912 in Clevedon.

== Possible de-extinction ==
Scientists at Harvard University assembled the first nearly complete genome of the species from toe bones, thus bringing the species a step closer to being "resurrected" in the future, likely by using the emu as a proxy.
