= List of tinamous =

There are 47 species and 123 subspecies from the family Tinamidae

== Tinaminae ==
- Tinamus
  - Tinamus guttatus white-throated tinamou
  - Tinamus tao grey tinamou
    - T. tao larensis
    - T. tao kleei
    - T. tao septentrionalis
    - T. tao tao
  - Tinamus solitarius solitary tinamou
  - Tinamus osgoodi black tinamou
    - T. osgoodi hershkovitzi
    - T. osgoodi osgoodi
  - Tinamus major great tinamou
    - T. major percautus
    - T. major robustus
    - T. major fuscipennis
    - T. major castaneiceps
    - T. major brunniventris
    - T. major saturatus
    - T. major latifrons
    - T. major zuliensis
    - T. major major
    - T. major olivascens
    - T. major peruvianus
    - T. major serratus
- Nothocercus
  - Nothocercus bonapartei highland tinamou
    - N. bonapartei frantzii
    - N. bonapartei bonapartei
    - N. bonapartei discrepans
    - N. bonapartei intercedens
    - N. bonapartei plumbeiceps
  - Nothocercus julius tawny-breasted tinamou
  - Nothocercus nigrocapillus hooded tinamou
    - N. nigrocapillus cadwaladeri
    - N. nigrocapillus nigrocapillus
- Crypturellus
  - Crypturellus berlepschi Berlepsch's tinamou
  - Crypturellus soui little tinamou
    - C. soui meserythrus
    - C. soui modestus
    - C. soui capnodes
    - C. soui poliocephalus
    - C. soui caucae
    - C. soui harterti
    - C. soui mustelinus
    - C. soui caqueta
    - C. soui nigriceps
    - C. soui soui
    - C. soui albigularis
    - C. soui inconspicuus
    - C. soui andrei
    - C. soui panamensis
  - Crypturellus cinereus cinereous tinamou
  - Crypturellus ptaritepui tepuí tinamou
  - Crypturellus obsoletus brown tinamou
    - C. obsoletus obsoletus
    - C. obsoletus griseiventris
    - C. obsoletus hypochraceus
    - C. obsoletus punensis
    - C. obsoletus traylori
    - C. obsoletus ochraceiventris
    - C. obsoletus castaneus
    - C. obsoletus knoxi
    - C. obsoletus cerviniventris
  - Crypturellus undulatus undulated tinamou
    - C. undulatus manapiare
    - C. undulatus simplex
    - C. undulatus adspersus
    - C. undulatus yapura
    - C. undulatus vermiculatus
    - C. undulatus undulatus
  - Crypturellus transfasciatus pale-browed tinamou
  - Crypturellus strigulosus Brazilian tinamou
  - Crypturellus duidae grey-legged tinamou
  - Crypturellus erythropus red-legged tinamou
    - C. erythropus erythropus
    - C. erythropus cursitans
    - C. erythropus spencei
    - C. erythropus margaritae
    - C. erythropus saltuarius Magdalena tinamou
    - C. erythropus columbianus Colombian tinamou
    - C. erythropus idoneus Santa Marta tinamou
  - Crypturellus noctivagus yellow-legged tinamou
    - C. noctivagus noctivagus
    - C. noctivagus zabele
  - Crypturellus atrocapillus black-capped tinamou
    - C. atrocapillus atrocapillus
    - C. atrocapillus garleppi
  - Crypturellus cinnamomeus thicket tinamou
    - C. cinnamomeus cinnamomeus
    - C. cinnamomeus occidentalis
    - C. cinnamomeus mexicanus
    - C. cinnamomeus sallaei
    - C. cinnamomeus goldmani
    - C. cinnamomeus soconuscensis
    - C. cinnamomeus vicinor
    - C. cinnamomeus delattrei
    - C. cinnamomeus praepes
  - Crypturellus boucardi slaty-breasted tinamou or Boucard's tinamou
    - C. boucardi boucardi
    - C. boucardi costaricensis
  - Crypturellus kerriae Chocó tinamou
  - Crypturellus variegatus variegated tinamou
  - Crypturellus brevirostris rusty tinamou or short-billed tinamou
  - Crypturellus bartletti Bartlett's tinamou
  - Crypturellus parvirostris small-billed tinamou
  - Crypturellus casiquiare barred tinamou
  - Crypturellus tataupa tataupa tinamou
    - C. tataupa tataupa
    - C. tataupa inops
    - C. tataupa peruvianus
    - C. tataupa lepidotus

== Nothurinae ==
- Rhynchotus
  - Rhynchotus rufescens red-winged tinamou
    - R. rufescens rufescens
    - R. rufescens catingae
    - R. rufescens pallescens
  - Rhynchotus maculicollis huayco tinamou
- Nothoprocta
  - Nothoprocta taczanowskii Taczanowski's tinamou
  - Nothoprocta ornata ornate tinamou
    - N. ornata ornata
    - N. ornata branickii
    - N. ornata rostrata
  - Nothoprocta perdicaria Chilean tinamou
    - N. perdicaria perdicaria
    - N. perdicaria sanborni
  - Nothoprocta cinerascens brushland tinamou
    - N. cinerascens cinerascens
    - N. cinerascens parvimaculata
  - Nothoprocta pentlandii Andean tinamou
    - N. pentlandii pentlandii
    - N. pentlandii ambigua
    - N. pentlandii oustaleti
    - N. pentlandii niethammeri
    - N. pentlandii fulvescens
    - N. pentlandii doeringi
    - N. pentlandii mendozae
  - Nothoprocta curvirostris curve-billed tinamou
    - N. curvirostris curvirostris
    - N. curvirostris peruviana
- Nothura
  - Nothura boraquira white-bellied nothura
  - Nothura minor lesser nothura
  - Nothura darwinii Darwin's nothura
    - N. darwinii darwinii
    - N. darwinii peruviana
    - N. darwinii agassizii
    - N. darwinii boliviana
    - N. darwinii salvadorii
  - Nothura maculosa spotted nothura
    - N. maculosa maculosa
    - N. maculosa major
    - N. maculosa nigroguttata
    - N. maculosa cearensis
    - N. maculosa paludivaga
    - N. maculosa annectens
    - N. maculosa submontana
    - N. maculosa pallida
    - N. maculosa pallida
    - N. maculosa chacoensis Chaco nothura
- Taoniscus
  - Taoniscus nanus dwarf tinamou
- Eudromia
  - Eudromia elegans elegant crested tinamou
    - E. elegans elegans
    - E. elegans intermedia
    - E. elegans magnistriata
    - E. elegans riojana
    - E. elegans albida
    - E. elegans multiguttata
    - E. elegans devia
    - E. elegans patagonica
  - Eudromia formosa quebracho crested tinamou
    - E. formosa formosa
    - E. formosa mira
- Tinamotis
  - Tinamotis pentlandii Puna tinamou or Pentland's tinamou
  - Tinamotis ingoufi Patagonian tinamou or Ingouf's tinamou
