= List of paleognath species =

The paleognaths (Palaeognathae) are a clade of bird species of gondwanic distribution in Africa, South America, New Guinea, Australia and New Zealand. The group have more than 50 living species and includes the ostriches, rheas, kiwis, emus, cassowaries and tinamous. They are, with Neognathae, the two main lineages of modern birds (Neornithes). Extinct species assignment follows the Mikko's Phylogeny Archive, Paleofile.com website and Brodkob.

== Summary of 2006 IUCN Red List categories ==

Conservation status [v2017.3, the data is current as of May 8, 2018]:

EX - extinct,
EW - extinct in the wild
CR - critically endangered
EN - endangered
VU - vulnerable
NT - near threatened
LC - least concern
DD - data deficient
NE - not evaluated

== Phylogeny ==
Phylogeny based on the work of John Boyd.

- Paleognathae
  - - Struthioniformes
      - Struthionidae
        Struthio Linnaeus 1758 (ostriches)
  - Notopalaeognathae
    - - - Rheimorphae
          - Rheiformes
            - Rheidae
              Rhea Brisson 1760 (rheas)
        - Novaeratitae
          - Casuariiformes
            - Casuariidae
              - Dromaius Vieillot 1816 (emus)
              - Casuarius Brisson 1760 (cassowaries)
          - - Apterygiformes
              - Apterygidae
                Apteryx Shaw 1813 (kiwis)
            - †Aepyornithiformes
              - †Aepyornithidae (Bonaparte 1853) (elephant birds)
      - Tinamomorphae
        - †Dinornithiformes
          - - †Megalapteryidae
              †Megalapteryx Haast 1886 (upland moa)
            - †Dinornithidae
              †Dinornis Owen 1843 (giant moas)
          - †Emeidae
            - †Pachyornis Lydekker 1891 (stout moas)
            - - †Anomalopteryx Reichenbach 1853 (bush moa)
              - - †Emeus Reichenbach 1853 (eastern moa)
                - †Euryapteryx Haast 1874 (broad-billed moas)
        - - †Lithornithiformes
            - †Lithornithidae Houde 1988 (false tinamous)
          - Tinamiformes
            - Tinamidae
              - Tinaminae
                - Nothocercus Bonaparte 1846
                - - Tinamus Hermann 1783
                  - Crypturellus Brabourne & Chubb 1914 (brown tinamous)
              - Nothurinae
                - - Tinamotis Vigors 1837
                  - Eudromia Geoffroy 1832
                - - Rhynchotus von Spix 1825
                  - - Nothoprocta Sclater & Salvin 1873
                    - - Taoniscus Gloger 1841 (Dwarf tinamou)
                      - Nothura Wagler 1827

== Species ==
=== Order Struthioniformes ===
- Family Struthionidae Vigors 1825 (ostriches)
  - Genus †Orientornis Wang 2008
    - †Orientornis linxiaensis (Hou et al. 2005) Wang 2008
  - ?Genus †Palaeotis Lambrecht 1928 (fossil: Middle Eocene)
    - †Palaeotis wiegelti Lambrecht 1928
  - ?Genus †Remiornis Lemoine, 1881
    - †Remiornis heberti Lemoine, 1881
  - Genus Struthio (2 living species)
    - ?†Struthio anderssoni Lowe 1931 [ootaxa]
    - ?†Struthio barbarus Arambourg 1979
    - †Struthio asiaticus Brodkorb 1863 [Milne-Edwards 1871] (Asian ostrich)
    - †Struthio chersonensis (Brandt 1873) Lambrecht 1921
    - †Struthio coppensi Mourer-Chauviré et al. 1996
    - ?†Struthio daberasensis Pickford, Senut & Dauphin 1995
    - †Struthio dmanisensis Burchak-Abramovich & Vekua 1990 (giant ostrich)
    - ?†Struthio epoasticus Bonaparte
    - ?†Struthio kakesiensis Harrison & Msuya 2005 [ootaxa]
    - ?†Struthio karingarabensis Senut, Dauphin & Pickford 1998 [ootaxa]
    - †Struthio oldawayi Lowe 1933
    - †Struthio transcaucasicus Burchak-Abramovich & Vekua 1971
    - †Struthio wimani Lowe 1931
    - Struthio molybdophanes Reichenow 1883 (Somali ostrich) VU
    - Struthio camelus Linnaeus 1758 (Common ostrich) LC
      - †S. c. syriacus Rothschild 1919 (Arabian ostrich) EX 1966
      - S. c. camelus Linnaeus 1758 (North African ostrich)
      - S. c. australis (Gurney 1868) (Southern African ostrich)
      - S. c. massaicus (Neumann 1898) (Masai ostrich)

=== Order Rheiformes ===
- Family †Opistodactylidae Ameghino 1895 (fossil)
  - Genus †Opisthodactylus Ameghino 1895 (Miocene of Argentina) - rheid?
    - †Opisthodactylus horacioperezi Agnolin & Chafrat 2015
    - †Opisthodactylus patagonicus Ameghino 1895
    - †Opisthodactylus kirchneri Noriega et al. 2017
- Family Rheidae Bonaparte 1853 (rheas)
  - Genus †Heterorhea Rovereto 1914 (fossil: Pliocene of Argentina)
    - †Heterorhea dabbenei Rovereto 1914
  - Genus †Hinasuri Tambussi 1995 (fossil)
    - †Hinasuri nehuensis Tambussi 1995
  - Genus †Protorhea Moreno & Mercerat 1891
    - †Protorhea azarae Moreno & Mercerat 1891
  - Genus Rhea Brisson 1760
    - ?†Rhea anchorenense (Ameghino & Rusconi 1932)
    - ?†Rhea fossilis Moreno & Mercerat 1891
    - ?†Rhea mesopotamica (Agnolín & Noriega 2012)
    - ?†Rhea subpampeana Moreno & Mercerat 1891
    - Rhea americana (Linnaeus 1758) Brisson 1760 (common rhea) NT
      - R. a. americana (Linnaeus 1758) (American rhea)
      - R. a. intermedia Rothschild & Chubb 1914 (intermediate rhea)
      - R. a. albescens (Lynch & Holmberg 1878) (Argentine rhea)
      - R. a. nobilis Brodkorb 1939
      - R. a. araneipes Brodkorb 1938
    - Rhea pennata d'Orbigny 1834 (lesser rhea)
      - R. p. pennata d'Orbigny 1834 (Darwin's lesser rhea) LC
      - R. p. garleppi (Chubb 1913) (Garlepp's rhea)
      - R. p. tarapacensis (Chubb 1913) (Tarapacá/Puna Rhea) NT

=== Order Casuariiformes ===
- Family Casuariidae Kaup 1847 (cassowaries & emus)
  - Genus Casuarius Brisson 1760
    - Casuarius bennetti Gould 1857 (dwarf cassowary) LC
      - C. b. bennetti Gould 1857 (Bennett's cassowary)
      - C. b. westermanni (Sclater 1874) (Papuan dwarf cassowary)
    - Casuarius casuarius (Linnaeus 1758) Brisson 1760 (southern cassowary) LC
    - †Casuarius lydekkeri Rothschild 1911 (pygmy cassowary)
    - Casuarius unappendiculatus Blyth 1860 (northern cassowary) LC
  - Genus †Diogenornis de Alvarenga 1983 tentatively placed here
    - †Diogenornis fragilis de Alvarenga 1983
  - Genus †Emuarius Boles 1992 (Emuwaries) (fossil: Late Oligocene - Late Miocene)
    - †Emuarius guljaruba Boles 2001
    - †Emuarius gidju (Patterson & Rich 1987) Boles 1992
  - Genus Dromaius Vieillot 1816 (emus) (1 living species, 2 recently extinct)
    - Dromaius novaehollandiae (Latham 1790) Vieillot 1816 LC
      - D. n. novaehollandiae (Latham 1790) Vieillot 1816 (mainland emu)
      - †D. n. baudinianus Parker 1984 (Kangaroo Island emu) EX 1827
      - †D. n. diemenensis (Jennings 1827) Le Souef 1907 (Tasmanian emu) EX c.1845-1884
      - †D. n. minor Spencer 1906 (King Island/black emu) EX 1822
    - †Dromaius ocypus (Miller 1963)
    - †Dromaius arleyekweke (Yates & Worthy 2019)

=== Order Apterygiformes ===
- Family Apterygidae Gray 1840 (kiwis)
  - Genus †Proapteryx Worthy et al. 2013
    - †Proapteryx micromeros Worthy et al. 2013
  - Genus Apteryx Shaw 1813
    - Apteryx australis Shaw 1813 (southern brown kiwi or tokoeka) VU
      - A. a. lawryi (Rothschild 1893) (Stewart Island tokoeka)
      - A. a. australis Shaw 1813 (Fiordland/Haast tokoeka)
    - Apteryx haastii Potts 1872 (great spotted kiwi) VU
    - Apteryx mantelli Bartlett 1852 (North Island brown kiwi) VU
    - Apteryx owenii Gould 1847 (little spotted kiwi) NT
      - †A. o. iredalei (Mathews 1935) (North Island little spotted kiwi) EX late 19th century
      - A. o. owenii Gould 1847 (South Island little spotted kiwi)
    - Apteryx rowi Tennyson et al. 2003 (Okarito brown kiwi) VU

=== Order †Aepyornithiformes ===
- Family †Aepyornithidae Bonaparte 1853 (elephant birds)
  - Genus †Aepyornis St. Hilaire 1850 (4 species)
    - †Aepyornis gracilis Monnier 1913 (gracile elephant bird)
    - †Aepyornis hildebrandti Burckhardt 1893 (Hildebrandt's elephant bird)
    - †Aepyornis maximus St. Hilaire 1851EX 16th century
    - †Aepyornis medius Milne-Edwards & Grandidier 1866 (medium/greater elephant bird) EX 16th century
  - Genus †Mullerornis Milne-Edwards & Grandidier 1894 (4 species)
    - †Mullerornis agilis Milne-Edwards & Grandidier 1894 (agile/coastal elephant bird)
    - †Mullerornis betsilei Milne-Edwards & Grandidier 1894 (Betsile elephant bird)
    - ?†Mullerornis grandis Lamberton 1934
    - †Mullerornis rudis Milne-Edwards & Grandidier 1894 (robust elephant bird)

=== Order †Dinornithiformes ===
- Family †Dinornithidae Owen 1843
  - Genus †Dinornis Owen 1843 (giant moas)
    - †Dinornis novaezealandiae Owen 1843 (North Island giant moa)
    - †Dinornis robustus (Owen 1846) Bunce et al. 2003 (South Island giant moa)
- Family †Megalapteryidae
  - Genus †Megalapteryx Haast 1886
    - †Megalapteryx didinus (Owen 1883) Haast 1886 (upland moa) EX late 15th century
- Family †Emeidae Bonaparte 1854 (lesser moas)
  - Genus †Anomalopteryx Reichenbach 1853
    - †Anomalopteryx didiformis (Owen 1844) Reichenbach 1853 (bush moa)
  - Genus †Emeus Reichenbach 1853
    - †Emeus crassus (Owen 1846) Reichenbach 1853 non Parker 1895 (eastern moa)
  - Genus †Euryapteryx Haast 1874 (broad-billed moas)
    - †Euryapteryx curtus (Owen 1846) (stout-legged moa)
    - †Euryapteryx gravis (Owen 1870) Haast 1874 (coastal moa)
  - Genus †Pachyornis Lydekker 1891 (stout moas)
    - †Pachyornis australis Oliver 1949 (crested moa)
    - †Pachyornis elephantopus (Owen 1856) Lydekker 1891 non Cracraft 1976 (heavy-footed moa)
    - †Pachyornis geranoides (Owen 1848) Worthy 2005 (Mantell's moa)

=== Order †Lithornithiformes ===
- Family †Lithornithidae Houde 1988 (false tinamous)
  - Genus †Calciavis Nesbitt & Clarke 2016 (early Eocene of Wyoming, USA)
    - †Calciavis grandei Nesbitt & Clarke 2016
  - Genus †Fissuravis Mayr 2007 (Paleocene of Germany)
    - †Fissuravis weigelti Mayr 2007
  - Genus †Lithornis Owen 1840 (Paleocene - Eocene)
    - †Lithornis celetius Houde 1988
    - †Lithornis hookeri Harrison 1984
    - †Lithornis nasi Harrison 1984
    - †Lithornis plebius Houde 1988
    - †Lithornis promiscuus Houde 1988
    - †Lithornis vulturinus Owen 1840
  - Genus †Paracathartes Harrison 1979 (early Eocene of Wyoming, USA) - tentatively placed here
    - †Paracathartes howardae Harrison 1979
  - Genus †Pseudocrypturus Houde 1988 (early Eocene of Wyoming, USA)
    - †Pseudocrypturus cercanaxius Houde 1988

=== Order Tinamiformes ===
- Family Tinamidae Gray 1840 (tinamous)
  - Genus †Roveretornis Brodkorb 1961
  - Genus †Querandiornis Rusconi 1958
    - †Querandiornis romani Rusconi 1958
  - Subfamily Tinaminae (forest tinamous)
    - Genus Crypturellus Brabourne & Chubb 1914 (brown tinamous)
      - †Crypturellus reai Chandler 2012
      - Crypturellus atrocapillus (Tschudi 1844) (black-capped tinamou) NT
        - C. a. atrocapillus (Tschudi 1844) (Black-capped Tinamou)
        - C. a. garleppi (von Berlepsch 1892)(Garlepp's Tinamou)
      - Crypturellus bartletti (Sclater & Salvin 1873) (Bartlett's tinamou) LC
      - Crypturellus berlepschi (Rothschild 1897) (Berlepsch's tinamou) LC
      - Crypturellus boucardi (Sclater 1860) (slaty-breasted tinamou) LC
        - C. b. boucardi (Sclater 1860) (Boucard's tinamou)
        - C. b. costaricensis (Dwight & Griscom 1924) (Costa Rica tinamou)
      - Crypturellus brevirostris (Pelzeln 1863) (rusty tinamou) LC
      - Crypturellus casiquiare (Chapman 1929) (barred tinamou) LC
      - Crypturellus cinereus (Gmelin 1789) (cinereous tinamou) LC
      - Crypturellus cinnamomeus (Lesson 1842) (thicket tinamou) LC
        - C. c. occidentalis (Salvadori 1895) (Western Thicket Tinamou)
        - C. c. cinnamomeus (Lesson 1842) (cinnamomeous tinamou)
        - C. c. delatrii (Bonaparte 1854) (Nicaraguan tinamou)
        - C. c. goldmani (Nelson 1901) (Goldman's tinamou)
        - C. c. mexicanus (Salvadori 1895) (Mexican tinamou)
        - C. c. praepes (Bangs & Peters 1927) (Bolson tinamou)
        - C. c. sallaei (Bonaparte 1856) (Sallé's tinamou)
        - C. c. soconuscensis Brodkorb 1939 (Chiapan tinamou)
        - C. c. vicinior Conover 1933 (Honduran tinamou)
      - Crypturellus duidae Zimmer 1938 (grey-legged tinamou) NT
      - Crypturellus erythropus (Pelzeln 1863) (red-legged tinamou) LC
        - C. e. columbianus (Salvadori 1895) (Colombian tinamou)
        - C. e. cursitans Wetmore & Phelps 1946
        - C. e. erythropus (Pelzeln 1863)
        - C. e. idoneus (Todd 1919) (Santa Marta tinamou)
        - C. e. margaritae Phelps & Phelps 1948
        - †C. e. saltuarius Wetmore 1950 (Magdalena tinamou) EX late 20th century
        - C. e. spencei (Brabourne & Chubb 1914)
      - Crypturellus kerriae (Chapman 1915) (Choco tinamou) VU
      - Crypturellus noctivagus (zu Wied-Neuwied 1820) (yellow-legged tinamou) NT
        - C. n. zabele (von Spix 1825)
        - C. n. noctivagus (zu Wied-Neuwied 1820)
      - Crypturellus obsoletus (Temminck 1815) (brown tinamou) LC
        - C. o. castaneus (Sclater 1858)
        - C. o. cerviniventris (Sclater & Salvin 1873) (cinnamon-bellied/fawn-vented brown tinamou)
        - C. o. griseiventris (Salvadori 1895) (gray-bellied/vented brown tinamou)
        - C. o. hypochrceus (Miranda-Ribeiro 1938)
        - C. o. knoxi Phelps 1976
        - C. o. obsoletus (Temminck 1815) (obsolete brown tinamou)
        - C. o. ochraceiventris (Stolzmann 1926) (ochre-bellied brown tinamou)
        - C. o. punensis (Chubb 1917) (Puno brown tinamou)
        - C. o. traylori Blake 1961 (Traylor's brown Tinamou)
      - Crypturellus parvirostris (Wagler 1827) (small-billed tinamou) LC
      - Crypturellus ptaritepui Zimmer & Phelps 1945 (Tepui tinamou) LC
      - Crypturellus soui (Hermann 1783) (little tinamou) LC
        - C. s. albigularis (Brabourne & Chubb 1914) (white-throated pileated tinamou)
        - C. s. andrei (Brabourne & Chubb 1914) (Andre's pileated tinamou)
        - C. s. capnodes Wetmore 1963
        - C. s. caquetae (Chapman 1915) (Caquetá pileated tinamou)
        - C. s. caucae (Chapman 1912) (Cauca pileated tinamou)
        - C. s. harterti (Brabourne & Chubb 1914) (Hartert's pileated tinamou)
        - C. s. inconspicuus Carriker 1935 (Bolivian pileated tinamou)
        - C. s. meserythrus (Sclater 1860) (Mexican/Guatemalan pileated tinamou)
        - C. s. modestus (Cabanis 1869) (Cabanis's pileated tinamou)
        - C. s. mustelinus (Bangs 1905) (Santa Marta pileated tinamou)
        - C. s. nigriceps (Chapman 1923) (black-pileated tinamou)
        - C. s. panamensis (Carriker 1910) (Panama pileated tinamou)
        - C. s. poliocephalu (Aldrich 1937) (gray-headed pileated tinamou)
        - C. s. soui (Hermann 1783) (pileated tinamou)
      - Crypturellus strigulosus (Temminck 1815) (Brazilian tinamou) LC
      - Crypturellus tataupa (Temminck 1815) (Tataupa tinamou) LC
        - C. t. inops Bangs & Noble 1918
        - C. t. lepidotus (Swainson 1837)
        - C. t. peruvianus (Cory 1915)
        - C. t. tataupa (Temminck 1815)
      - Crypturellus transfasciatus (Sclater & Salvin 1878) (pale-browed tinamou) NT
      - Crypturellus undulatus (Temminck 1815) (undulated tinamou) LC
        - C. u. adspersus (Temminck 1815) (Temminck's banded tinamou)
        - C. u. manapiare Phelps & Phelps 1952
        - C. u. simplex (Salvadori 1895) (modest banded tinamou)
        - C. u. undulatus (Temminck 1815) (Undulated/banded/radiated Tinamou)
        - C. u. vermiculatus (Temminck 1825) (vermiculated tinamou)
        - C. u. yaputa (von Spix 1825) (Yapurá banded tinamou)
      - Crypturellus variegatus (Gmelin 1789) (variegated tinamou) LC
    - Genus Tinamus Hermann 1783
      - Tinamus guttatus Pelzeln 1863 (pale white-throated tinamou) NT
      - Tinamus major (Gmelin 1789) (great tinamou) NT
        - T. m. brunneiventris Aldrich 1937 (brown-breasted tinamou)
        - T. m. castaneiceps Salvadori 1895 (chestnut-crowned tinamou)
        - T. m. fuscipennis Salvadori 1895 (dusky-winged tinamou)
        - T. m. latifrons Salvadori 1895 (Ecuadorian/slate-fronted tinamou)
        - T. m. major (Gmelin 1789) (Guiana great tinamou)
        - T. m. olivascens Conover 1937 (olivaceous tinamou)
        - T. m. percautus van Tyne 1935 (Petén tinamou)
        - T. m. peruvianus Bonaparte 1856 (Peruvian tinamou)
        - T. m. robustus Sclater & Salvin 1868 (robust/great Mexican tinamou)
        - T. m. saturatus Griscom 1929 (saturated tinamou)
        - T. m. serratus (von Spix 1825) (Rio Negro tinamou)
        - T. m. zuliensis Osgood & Conover 1922 (Zulia tinamou)
      - Tinamus osgoodi Conover 1949 (black tinamou) VU
        - T. o. hershkovitzi Blake 1953
        - T. o. osgoodi Conover 1949 (Huila black tinamou)
      - Tinamus solitarius (Vieillot 1819) (solitary tinamou) NT
      - Tinamus tao Temminck 1815 (grey tinamou) VU A3c
        - T. t. kleei (Tschudi 1843) (Klee's tinamou)
        - T. t. larensis Phelps & Phelps 1949 (Lara tinamou)
        - T. t. septentrionalis Brabourne & Chubb 1913 (northern gray tinamou)
        - T. t. tao Temminck 1815 (great gray tinamou)
    - Genus Nothocercus Bonaparte 1846
      - Nothocercus bonapartei (Gray 1867) (highland tinamou) LC
        - N. b. frantzii subspecies-group
          - N. b. frantzii (Lawrence 1868) (Frantzius'/Costa Rican tinamou)
        - N. b. bonapartei subspecies-group
          - N. b. bonapartei (Gray 1867) (Bonaparte's highland tinamou)
          - N. b. discrepans Friedmann 1947 (Colombian highland tinamou)
          - N. b. intercedens Salvadori 1895 (Antioquia/Salvadori's white-throated tinamou)
          - N. b. plumbeiceps Lonnberg & Rendahl 1922 (gray-capped tinamou)
      - Nothocercus julius (Bonaparte 1854) (tawny-breasted tinamou) LC
      - Nothocercus nigrocapillus (Gray 1867) (hooded tinamou) VU A3c
        - N. n. cadwaladeri Carriker 1933 (Cadwalader's tinamou)
        - N. n. nigrocapillus (Gray 1867)
  - Subfamily Nothurinae (Steppe tinamous)
    - Genus Eudromia Saint-Hilaire 1832 (crested tinamous)
      - †Eudromia intermedia (Rovereto 1914)
      - †Eudromia olsoni Tambussi & Tonni 1985
      - Eudromia elegans Saint-Hilaire 1832 (elegant crested tinamou) LC
        - E. e. albida (Wetmore 1921) (pale elegant tinamou)
        - E. e. devia Conover 1950 (Neuquen elegant tinamou)
        - E. e. elegans Saint-Hilaire 1832 (Elegant crested tinamou)
        - E. e. intermedia (Dabbene & Lillo 1913) (Tucuman elegant tinamou)
        - E. e. magnistriata Olrog 1959 (Santiago del Estero crested tinamou)
        - E. e. multiguttata Conover 1950 (eastern elegant tinamou)
        - E. e. numida Banks 1977
        - E. e. patagonica Conover 1950 (southern elegant tinamou)
        - E. e. riojana Olrog 1959 (La Rioja crested tinamou)
        - E. e. wetmorei Banks 1977
      - Eudromia formosa (Lillo 1905) (quebracho crested tinamou) LC
        - E. f. formosa (Lillo 1905) (Lillo's crested tinamou)
        - E. f. mira Brodkorb 1938 (Paraguayan crested tinamou)
    - Genus Nothoprocta Sclater & Salvin 1873
      - Nothoprocta cinerascens (Burmeister 1860) (brushland tinamou) LC
        - N. c. cinerascens (Burmeister 1860)
        - N. c. parvimaculata Olrog 1959
      - Nothoprocta curvirostris Sclater & Salvin 1873 (curve-billed tinamou) LC
        - N. c. curvirostris Sclater & Salvin 1873
        - N. c. peruviana Taczanowski 1886 (Peruvian tinamou)
      - Nothoprocta ornata (Gray 1867) (ornate tinamou) LC
        - N. o. branickii Taczanowski 1875 (Branicki's tinamou)
        - N. o. ornata (Gray 1867)(Ornate Tinamou)
        - N. o. rostrata von Berlepsch 1907 (long-billed tinamou)
      - Nothoprocta pentlandii (Gray 1867) (Andean tinamou) LC
        - N. p. ambigua Cory 1915
        - N. p. doeringi Schulz ex Cabanis 1878
        - N. p. fulvescens Berlepsch 1902 (fulvescent tinamou)
        - N. p. mendozae Banks & Bohl 1968
        - N. p. niethammeri Koepcke 1968
        - N. p. oustaleti von Berlepsch & Stolzmann 1901 (Oustalet's tinamou)
        - N. p. pentlandii (Gray 1867) (Pentland's tinamou)
      - Nothoprocta perdicaria (Kittlitz 1830) (Chilean tinamou) LC
        - N. p. perdicaria (Kittlitz 1830) (Chilean Tinamou)
        - N. p. sanborni Conover 1924 (Sanborn's tinamou)
      - Nothoprocta taczanowskii Sclater & Salvin 1875 (Taczanowski's tinamou) VU
    - Genus Nothura Wagler 1827 (nothuras)
      - †Nothura paludosa Mercerat 1897
      - †Nothura parvula (Rovereto) Tambussi 1989
      - Nothura boraquira (von Spix 1825) (white-bellied nothura) LC
      - Nothura chacoensis (Conover 1937) (Chaco nothura) LC
      - Nothura darwinii Gray 1867 (Darwin's nothura) LC
        - N. d. agassizii Bangs 1910 (Agassiz's tinamou)
        - N. d. boliviana Salvadori 1895 (Bolivian tinamou)
        - N. d. darwinii Gray 1867 (Darwin's tinamou)
        - N. d. peruviana von Berlepsch & Stolzmann 1906 (Peruvian nothura)
        - N. d. salvadorii Hartert 1909 (Argentine tinamou)
      - Nothura maculosa (Temminck 1815) (spotted nothura) LC
        - N. m. annectens Conover 1950
        - N. m. cearensis Naumberg 1932 (Ceará nothura)
        - N. m. maculosa (Temminck 1815)(Spotted Tinamou)
        - N. m. major (von Spix 1825) (Spix's nothura)
        - N. m. nigroguttata Salvadori 1895 (black-spotted nothura)
        - N. m. pallida Olrog 1959
        - N. m. paludivaga Conover 1950
        - N. m. submontan Conover 1937
      - Nothura minor (von Spix 1825) (lesser nothura) VU C2a(i)
    - Genus Rhynchotus von Spix 1825
      - Rhynchotus maculicollis Gray 1867 (Huayco tinamou) LC
      - Rhynchotus rufescens (Temminck 1815) von Spix 1825 (red-winged tinamou) LC
        - R. r. catingae Reiser 1905 (catinga tinamou)
        - R. r. pallescens Kothe 1907 (Argentine tinamou)
        - R. r. rufescens (Temminck 1815) (rufous tinamou)
    - Genus Taoniscus Gloger 1841
      - Taoniscus nanus (Temminck 1815) Gloger 1841 (dwarf tinamou) VU A2c+3c+4c
    - Genus Tinamotis Vigors 1837
      - Tinamotis ingoufi Oustalet 1890 (Patagonian tinamou) LC
      - Tinamotis pentlandii Vigors 1837 (Puna tinamou) LC

=== Sometimes placed here ===
- †Genus Eremopezus Andrews 1904
  - †Eremopezus eocaenus Andrews 1904
- †Genus Stromeria Lambrecht 1929
  - †Stromeria fajumensis Lambrecht 1929

Ichnotaxa and ootaxa

- †Ageroolithus Vianey-Liaud & Lopez-Martinez 1997 [ootaxa]
  - †Ageroolithus fontllongensis Vianey-Liaud & Lopez-Martinez 1997
- †Continuoolithus Zelenitsky, Hills & Curri 1996 [ootaxa]
  - †Continuoolithus canadensis Zelenitsky, Hills & Curri 1996
- †Diamantornis Pickford et al. 1995 [ootaxa] (Middle Miocene of Namibia - Late Miocene of UAE and Kenya) - ratite?
  - †D. corbetti
  - †D. laini Pickford et al. 1995
  - †D. spaggiarii Senut, Dauphin & Pickford 1998
  - †D. wardi
- †Gobioolithus Mikhailov 1996 [ootaxa] (Late Cretaceous) - paleognath?
  - †Gobioolithus minor Mikhailov 1996
- †Incognitoolithus Hirsch, Kihm & Zelenitsky 1997 [ootaxa] (Eocene of North America) - ratite?
  - †Incognitoolithus ramotubulus Hirsch, Kihm & Zelenitsky 1997
- †Namornis Pickford, Senut & Dauphin 1995 [ootaxa] (Middle Miocene of Namibia - Late Miocene of Kenya) - ratite?
  - †N. elimensis Pickford 2014
  - †N. oshanai (Sauer 1966) Pickford, Senut & Dauphin 1995
- †Porituberoolithus Zelenitsky, Hills & Curri 1996 [ootaxa]
  - †Porituberoolithus warnerensis Zelenitsky, Hills & Curri 1996
- †Psammornis Andrews 1910 [ootaxa] - may be from Eremopezus
  - †D. rothschildi Andrews 1910
  - †D. lybicus
- †Tsondabornis Pickford 2014 [ootaxa; Type A ("aepyornithoid") eggs] (Tsondab Early Miocene of Namibia - Pliocene of Asia)
  - †T. minor Pickford 2014
  - †T. psammoides Pickford 2014

== See also ==
- List of recently extinct birds
- Late Quaternary prehistoric birds
- List of fossil bird genera
