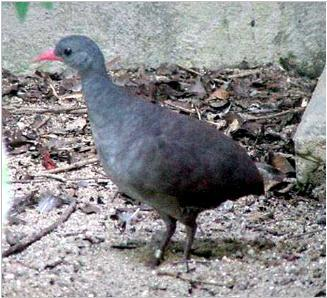
- Tataupa tinamou (Crypturellus tataupa)

Scientific classification
- Kingdom: Animalia
- Phylum: Chordata
- Class: Aves
- Infraclass: Palaeognathae
- Order: Tinamiformes; Huxley (1872)
- Family: Tinamidae; Gray 1840
- Subfamily: Tinaminae; Gray 1840

Genera
- Crypturellus; Nothocercus; Tinamus

Synonyms
- Crypturinae Bonaparte 1849

= Tinaminae =

Tinaminae Temporal range: Miocene–present Mid-Miocene to present

Subfamily of birds

Tinaminae, the forest tinamous, is one of two subfamilies of the family Tinamidae, the other being Nothurinae.

== Description ==
These birds, like other tinamous, are ground birds that prefer to run and walk, but will fly when they must. They differ physiologically by having their nostrils halfway down their bill or more. They range in size from the largest, being the grey tinamou at 49 centimetres (19 in) and the solitary tinamou at 1,800 grams (63 oz), which are also the largest of all the tinamous, to the little tinamou at 21.5–24 centimetres (8.5–9.4 in) and 174–238 grams (6.1–8.4 oz) and the small-billed tinamou at 20–32 centimetres (7.9–12.6 in) and 154–250 grams (5.4–8.8 oz).

They are a very compact muscular bird, with a slightly decurved beak. Their tail is short and rudimentary and appears near non-existent. They have a large amount of feathers on their back and posterior regions. some believe to assist in escaping predators by being able to shed feathers that have been grabbed.

Their plumage is drab and cryptic with colors of dark brown, rufous, and buff. They tend to be more uniform with less speckling and striping than their cousins of subfamily Nothurinae, the steppe tinamous. Some of the members of the genus Crypturellus are sexually dimorphic with the females being brighter and having more barring with the rest of the subfamily having only slightly larger females as the only difference in the sexes.

== Taxonomy ==
The tinamous are related to the ratites (emus, ostriches, kiwis, and rheas), and are grouped with them in the superorder Paleognathae. All of these birds evolved from ancient birds that did fly; the tinamous are a primitive family closely related to these ancient birds. Tinaminae has more species than the other subfamily, containing 29 species in three genera:

- Crypturellus (21 species)
- Nothocercus (3 species)
- Tinamus (5 species)

Image	Genus	Living species
	Tinamus Hermann, 1783	White-throated tinamou (Tinamus guttatus) – southeastern Colombia, southern Venezuela, Amazonian Brazil, and northern Bolivia; Grey tinamou (Tinamus tao) – northern and western Brazil, eastern Ecuador, eastern Peru, northern Bolivia, Colombia east of the Andes, northwestern and northeastern Venezuela, and northwestern Guyana; Solitary tinamou (Tinamus solitarius) – northeastern Argentina (Misiones), eastern Paraguay, eastern Brazil; Black tinamou (Tinamus osgoodi) – in two small areas: the Andes of southeastern Peru and the Andes of Colombia; Great tinamou (Tinamus major) – from southeastern Mexico through Panama, excluding Honduras and from Ecuador to French Guiana, parts of Brazil and northern Bolivia
	Crypturellus Brabourne & Chubb, C, 1914	Berlepsch's tinamou (Crypturellus berlepschi) – coastal forests of northwestern Colombia and northwestern Ecuador; Little tinamou (Crypturellus soui) – southern Mexico to northeastern Brazil west to Ecuador and east to French Guiana and also Trinidad; Cinereous tinamou (Crypturellus cinereus) – southeastern Colombia, southern Venezuela, Guyana, French Guiana, Suriname, northeastern Brazil, and northern Bolivia; Tepui tinamou (Crypturellus ptaritepui) – the tepuis of southern Venezuela; Brown tinamou (Crypturellus obsoletus) – northern Venezuela west through Ecuador, Peru, northern and southern Brazil, extreme northeastern Argentina, eastern Bolivia, and Paraguay; Undulated tinamou (Crypturellus undulatus) – northern and central South America except Suriname and French Guiana; Pale-browed tinamou (Crypturellus transfasciatus) – coastal forests of Ecuador and extreme northwestern Peru; Brazilian tinamou (Crypturellus strigulosus) – central Brazil south of the Amazon River, northwestern Bolivia, and eastern Peru; Grey-legged tinamou (Crypturellus duidae) – the tropical forests of east central Colombia and southern Venezuela; Red-legged tinamou (Crypturellus erythropus) – from northern Colombia east to French Guiana and south to northern Brazil and also Margarita Island; Yellow-legged tinamou (Crypturellus noctivagus) – the lowlands of eastern Brazil; Black-capped tinamou (Crypturellus atrocapillus) – the lowlands of southeastern Peru and northern Bolivia; Thicket tinamou (Crypturellus cinnamomeus) – from northwestern Costa Rica north to Puebla, Mexico, and all of the Atlantic coastal Mexico and Pacific coastal Mexico excluding Sonora, Mexico; Slaty-breasted tinamou or Boucard's tinamou (Crypturellus boucardi) – the gulf coastal region of Central America from southeastern Mexico to northeastern Honduras and southeastern Honduras to northern Costa Rica; Choco tinamou (Crypturellus kerriae) – humid foothills of southeastern Panama to northwestern Colombia; Variegated tinamou (Crypturellus variegatus) – northern Bolivia, Amazonian Brazil, French Guiana, Guyana, Suriname, Venezuela, and Colombia; Rusty tinamou or short-billed tinamou (Crypturellus brevirostris) – French Guiana, eastern Peru, and northwestern and northeastern Brazil; Bartlett's tinamou (Crypturellus bartletti) – western Amazonian Brazil, northern Bolivia, and eastern Peru; Small-billed tinamou (Crypturellus parvirostris) – from the Amazon Basin in Brazil to northeastern Argentina; Barred tinamou (Crypturellus casiquiare) – eastern Colombia and southern Venezuela; Tataupa tinamou (Crypturellus tataupa) – parts of Peru, northeastern Brazil, Paraguay, southern Brazil, eastern Bolivia, and northern Argentina
	Nothocercus Bonaparte, 1856	Nothocercus bonapartei Highland tinamou; Nothocercus julius Tawny-breasted tinamou; Nothocercus nigrocapillus Hooded tinamou

== Behavior ==
The larger members of the sub-family, and in particular Tinamus members roost in trees. They do so on fairly horizontal branches and will pick out branches that are 2–5 metres (6.6–16.4 ft) off the ground. They will fly to the branch with a noisy burst of flying while expending amounts of energy that they prefer not to. To make this an easier task, they will attempt to approach the branch from an uphill location so as to not need to gain as much altitude in flight. This technique is also used when they need to vacate quickly to avoid danger, in that they will fly downhill, so as to be able to cover greater distances before the need to touch down. When roosting they will not grip the branch with their toes, but rest on their folded legs. This is the reason the back of their tarsus is rough, and for their choice of branches being thick. They will use the same roost for an extended period of time, moving away from the roost to defecate so as to not plant easy evidence of their sleeping location to potential predators.

They tend to be a solitary bird and will usually only approach members of the same species during breeding season and only the opposite sex. However, some species do maintain contact with their mate year-round.

=== Voice ===
Tinamous in general are a very loud species, with clear, distinct, and sharp calls that reverberate throughout the area. These species are no exception. For example, the highland tinamou can be heard from several kilometers through the thick vegetation of the rain forest. Their calls tend to be deep and loud, designed to penetrate the many layers of the habitat that they frequent. They have many different calls and songs, each one serving a different purpose, for example, the solitary tinamou has as many as 11 different vocalizations, most of which can be linked to pairing, contact calling, or territorial defense. Some species, in particular, the members of Crypturellus have a regional variation in tone of their calls. In fact, some species, like the slaty-breasted tinamou have individually unique calls and can be recognized individually by humans based on these calls. Finally, members of Crypturellus have been known to use regular calling locations.

=== Feeding ===
Members of these genera, because of their residence in the forests, tend to eat fleshy fruit as their predominate choice of food. That is not to say they will not eat other objects, as they are a very opportunistic group. For example, they will also eat leaves, buds, and seeds, and will eat insects for variety. When eating, they prefer to eat their food of the ground but will grab it off low-hanging branches as well. In fact, members of Crypturellus have been documented jumping as high as 1 metre (39 in) for insects.

Some species require regular sources of water for hydration while others like the solitary tinamou can survive without a permanent source of water, and will gain their water from the succulent choices of fruit. When drinking, they are unlike most other birds in that they do not lift their heads bill high after imbibing to allow the liquid the use of gravity to help it down. Instead, they have the ability to suck and swallow.

=== Breeding ===
Tinaminae species normally practice a complex breeding strategy. This entails the males practicing simultaneous polygyny and the females practicing successive polyandry. Breeding season fluctuates with the species; however the majority of the species within the forest breed throughout the year, with an emphasis on when the food is most abundant.

They are a very territorial group of birds; however sometimes only during breeding season. When defending their territory against possible intruders, they can get extremely vocal, especially members of Crypturellus.

Courtship consists of males attracting the females with their continuous calling, then some species, like the male members of Tinamus will court the females by lowering his chest to the ground, stretch his neck forward, fluff up his posterior in an attempt to appear long.

When placing their nest, they will choose to do so at the base of a tree, in between several buttresses. Some species do not actually build a nest, choosing instead to lay their eggs on thin bed of leaves placed in a strategic location. The eggs of these birds have a wide range of coloring; however the do have similar features in that they are solid coloring, with no speckles or spots. Also they have a shiny, porcelain like quality. Finally, over time the colors fade and usually change to a different less bright color.

Once the eggs are laid the female moves on to find another male, to lay more eggs in another nest. Because of this there needs to be a disparate number of females to males, in fact the variegated tinamou has a 4:1 female to male ratio. Incubation ranges from 16 days in members of Crypturellus to 19–20 days in Tinamus. During this period the male does not call out unless he leaves the nest first.

Chicks hatch synchronously and gain maturity rapidly. When they are born, they have a downy coatof white, grey, or yellow coloration. Within 20 days, slaty-breasted tinamou have gained adult size, bit not weight.

Some species raise multiple broods per year, such as the slaty-breasted tinamou.

=== Movement ===
Tinamous are typically sedentary birds; however they do move in limited situations. For example, if the weather is not cooperating, such as flooding or drought, they will move to a different forest. Amazonian species will move from the varzea forest to the terra firme forests and back again.

Some species, like the slaty-breasted tinamou maintain a large home range, and will move within it seemingly at random.

== Range and habitat ==
The members of this subfamily live in South and Central America, in the Neotropical region, and range from San Matias Gulf north to Tampico, Tamaulipas. They prefer to live in forests, unlike the Nothurinae, which do not require forests and can live in drier climates. They reside in a wide range of altitude, with Nothocercus occupying the higher elevations.

With the great number of species that reside in the forests of the southern and Central America, there is a need for a mechanism to allow similar species to live closely without strict competition. This is done by the use of micro-habitats. Panama gives a great example of the ecological separation of these birds. The highland tinamou occupies the highlands throughout the country. The great tinamou prefers the rain forests on the slopes. The Choco tinamou also like the rain forest, but they are limited to the southeast of the country. Finally, the little tinamou is found in dense secondary forest on either the Pacific or Atlantic slope above 1,000 metres (3,300 ft). With this, one will notice that the great and little tinamous both occupy similar habitats; however the size difference means that there is little direct competition for food.

== Relationship with man ==
Tinamous have established themselves in the folklore and the histories of the indigenous people of South and Central America. Forest tribes of Brazil and Colombia believe the jaguar imitates the call of the great tinamou in order to track and eat it. A tale amongst the Guahibo Indians tells of a young man traveling by canoe trying to locate the calling tinamou. As he approached the bank he became suspicious at the harshness of the call and backed away just as a jaguar burst out of the vegetation.

Panamanian tradition states that after the "Great Flood", the great tinamou grew frightened of the bright colors in the rainbow. He flew away from the rainbow, the ark, and the rest of the animals, heading for the darkest part of the forest, where he has remained ever since.

Captive breeding, whereas is more successful and popular with members of Nothurinae, is done with members of Crypturellus in Rio Grande do Sul, Brazil.

== Conservation ==
Of all the members of Tinaminae, six are considered near threatened and four are vulnerable according to IUCN, including the entire genus Tinamus.

The solitary tinamou, Tinamus solitarius, is another endangered tinamou. This bird is limited to the Atlantic forests of Brazil, Paraguay, and Argentina. Here it is threatened by habitat destruction and pressures from hunters. The government of Brazil has realized the need for protection of the remaining forests and the species.

In the cloud forests of northern South America, the black tinamou has less than 10,000 birds left, and the Tepui tinamou is in a unique situation. With the Tepui tinamou, the numbers suggest that it is doing well; however its range is so limited as it lives on the tops of a handful of plateaus in the cloud forests of Venezuela, that any problem could seriously jeopardize its numbers.

== Bibliography ==
- Brown, Joseph W. (2005). "Tinamiformes, Tinamidae, tinamous". Tree of Life Web Project.
- Davies, S. j. j. f. (2003). "Tinamous Tinamidae)". In Hutchins, Michael; Jackson, Jerome A.; Bock, Walter J.; Olendorf, Donna (eds.). Grzimek's Animal Life Encyclopedia. Vol. 8 Birds I Tinamous and Ratites to Hoatzins. Joseph E. Trumpey, Chief Scientific Illustrator (2nd ed.). Farmington Hills, MI: Gale Group. pp. 57–67. ISBN 0-7876-5784-0.
