= List of Tinamiformes by population =

This is a list of Tinamiformes species by global population. While numbers are estimates, they have been made by the experts in their fields. For more information on how these estimates were ascertained, see Wikipedia's articles on population biology and population ecology.

This list is not comprehensive, as not all Tinamiformes have had their numbers quantified.

== Species by global population ==
| Common name | Binomial name | Population | Status | Trend | Notes | Image |
|---|---|---|---|---|---|---|
| Choco tinamou | Crypturellus kerriae | 1,300-7,800 | NT | ▼ | | |
| Taczanowski's tinamou | Nothoprocta taczanowskii | 1,500-7,000 | VU | ▼ | | |
| Black tinamou | Tinamus osgoodi | 1,900-4,400 | VU | ▼ | Preliminary estimate. | |
| Dwarf tinamou | Taoniscus nanus | 2,500-9,999 | EN | ▼ | | |
| Lesser nothura | Nothura minor | 2,500-9,999 | VU | ▼ | | |
| Yellow-legged tinamou | Crypturellus noctivagus | 10,000-19,999 | NT | ▼ | | |
| Slaty-breasted tinamou | Crypturellus boucardi | 20,000-49,999 | VU | ▼ | | |
| Solitary tinamou | Tinamus solitarius | 50,000-200,000 | NT | ▼ | | |
| Highland tinamou | Nothocercus bonapartei | 50,000-500,000 | LC | ▼ | | |
| Black-capped tinamou | Crypturellus atrocapillus | 80,000-300,000 | LC | ▼ | | |
| Grey tinamou | Tinamus tao | 100,000-499,999 | VU | ▼ | | |
| Hooded tinamou | Nothocercus nigrocapillus | 100,000-499,999 | LC | ▼ | | |
| Grey-legged tinamou | Crypturellus duidae | 100,000-499,999 | LC | ▼ | | |
| White-throated tinamou | Tinamus guttatus | 200,000-500,000 | NT | ▼ | | |
| Thicket tinamou | Crypturellus cinnamomeus | 500,000-4,999,999 | LC | ▼ | | |
| Little tinamou | Crypturellus soui | 500,000-5,000,000 | LC | ▼ | | |
| Great tinamou | Tinamus major | 5,000,000-49,999,999 | LC | ▼ | | |

== See also ==
- Lists of birds by population
- Lists of organisms by population
