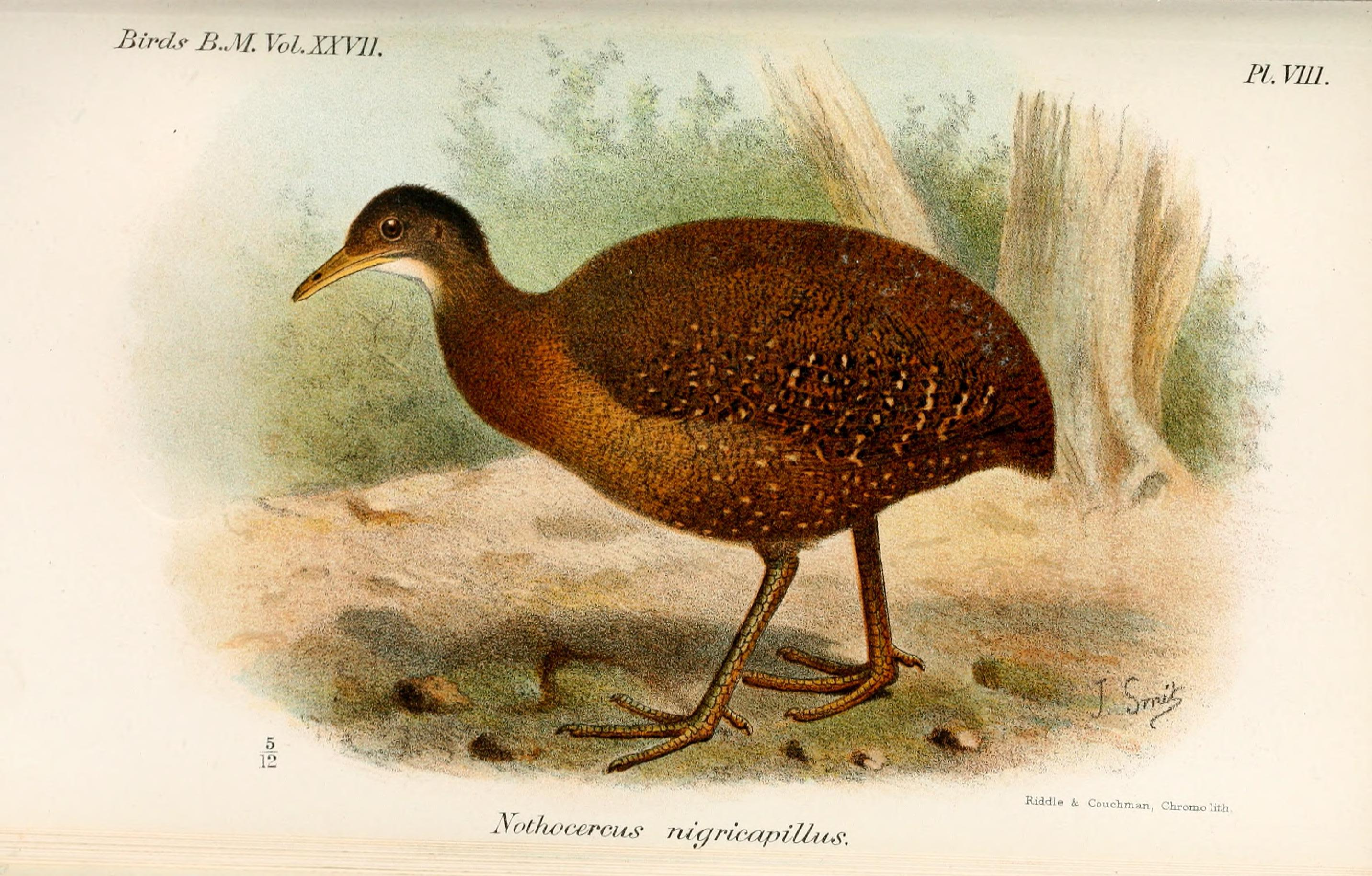
- Illustration of Nothocercus nigrocapillus (hooded tinamou) by Joseph Smit, 1895

Scientific classification
- Kingdom: Animalia
- Phylum: Chordata
- Class: Aves
- Infraclass: Palaeognathae
- Order: Tinamiformes
- Family: Tinamidae
- Subfamily: Tinaminae
- Genus: Nothocercus; Bonaparte, 1856

Type species
- Tinamus julius Bonaparte, 1854

Species
- Nothocercus bonapartei Highland tinamou; Nothocercus julius Tawny-breasted tinamou; Nothocercus nigrocapillus Hooded tinamou

= Nothocercus =

Genus of birds

Nothocercus is a genus of birds in the tinamou family. This genus comprises three species of this South American family.

Nothocercus julius (the tawny-breasted tinamou) occupies humid montane forest at middle to high elevations in the Andes from Venezuela south to Peru. It is currently losing its habitat due to clearance of the forest due to agricultural and livestock grazing.

== Etymology ==
Nothocercus: Greek: νοθος nothos "spurious"; κερκος kerkos "tail"

== Species ==
The species are:

- Nothocercus bonapartei, highland tinamou located in the Andes of Colombia, Ecuador, northern Peru, western Venezuela, and the highlands of Costa Rica and western Panama
  - Nothocercus bonapartei frantzii located in Costa Rica and western Panama
  - Nothocercus bonapartei bonapartei located in northwestern Venezuela and northern Colombia
  - Nothocercus bonapartei discrepans located in central Colombia
  - Nothocercus bonapartei intercedens located in western Colombia
  - Nothocercus bonapartei plumbeiceps located in eastern Ecuador and northern Peru
- Nothocercus julius, tawny-breasted tinamou located in the Andes of central Colombia, far western Venezuela, locally in Ecuador, and south central Peru
- Nothocercus nigrocapillus, hooded tinamou located in the Andes of Peru, and Bolivia
  - Nothocercus nigrocapillus nigrocapillus located in central Peru and Bolivia
  - Nothocercus nigrocapillus cadwaladeri located in northwestern Peru
