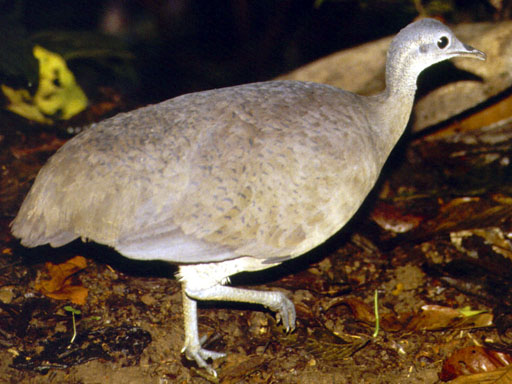
- Great tinamou (Tinamus major)

Scientific classification
- Kingdom: Animalia
- Phylum: Chordata
- Class: Aves
- Infraclass: Palaeognathae
- Order: Tinamiformes
- Family: Tinamidae
- Subfamily: Tinaminae
- Genus: Tinamus; Hermann, 1783

Type species
- Tetrao major Gmelin, JF, 1789

Species
- see text

= Tinamus =

Genus of birds

Tinamus is a genus of birds in the tinamou family Tinamidae. This genus comprises some of the larger members of this South American family.

== Taxonomy ==
The genus Tinamus was introduced in 1783 by the French naturalist Johann Hermann. He placed a single species in the genus, Tinamus soui, the little tinamou. Hermann based the genus name on "Les Tinamous" used by Georges-Louis Leclerc, Comte de Buffon in his Histoire Naturelle des Oiseaux. The word "Tinamú" in the Carib language of French Guiana was used for the tinamous. In 1790 the English ornithologist John Latham introduced a genus with the same name, Tinamus, also based on Buffon's work, and included five species in the genus. He did not specify the type species but in 1840 the English zoologist George Gray designated the type of Tetranus as Tetrao major Gmelin, 1789 and attributed the genus to Latham (1790) and not to Hermann (1783).

Although ornithologists realised that Tetranus Hermann, 1783 was earlier and therefore had priority, the type species was accepted as Tetrao major. In 2025 Sara Bertelli and collaborators pointed out that under the rules of the International Commission on Zoological Nomenclature (ICZN), the type species should be Tinamus soui by monotypy. This species is now placed in a different genus, Crypturellus. Bertelli and collaborators proposed that the species currently placed in the genus Crypturellus should be moved to Tetranus with Tinamus soui as the type, while the species currently placed in Tetranus should be moved to a resurrected genus Pezus that had been introduced in 1825 by the German naturalist Johann Baptist von Spix. The type species of Pezus was fixed as Tinamus major by Gray in 1840.

The genus contains five species:

Image	Common name	Scientific name	Distribution
	Grey tinamou	Tinamus tao	Amazonia
	Solitary tinamou	Tinamus solitarius	east Brazil to northeast Argentina and east Paraguay
	Black tinamou	Tinamus osgoodi	central south Colombia and southeast Peru
	Great tinamou	Tinamus major	south Mexico through Amazonia
	White-throated tinamou	Tinamus guttatus	Amazonia

In 2025 a potentially new species of tinamou, the slaty-masked tinamou (Tinamus resonans) was described from the Sierra del Divisor in the Brazilian state of Acre.
