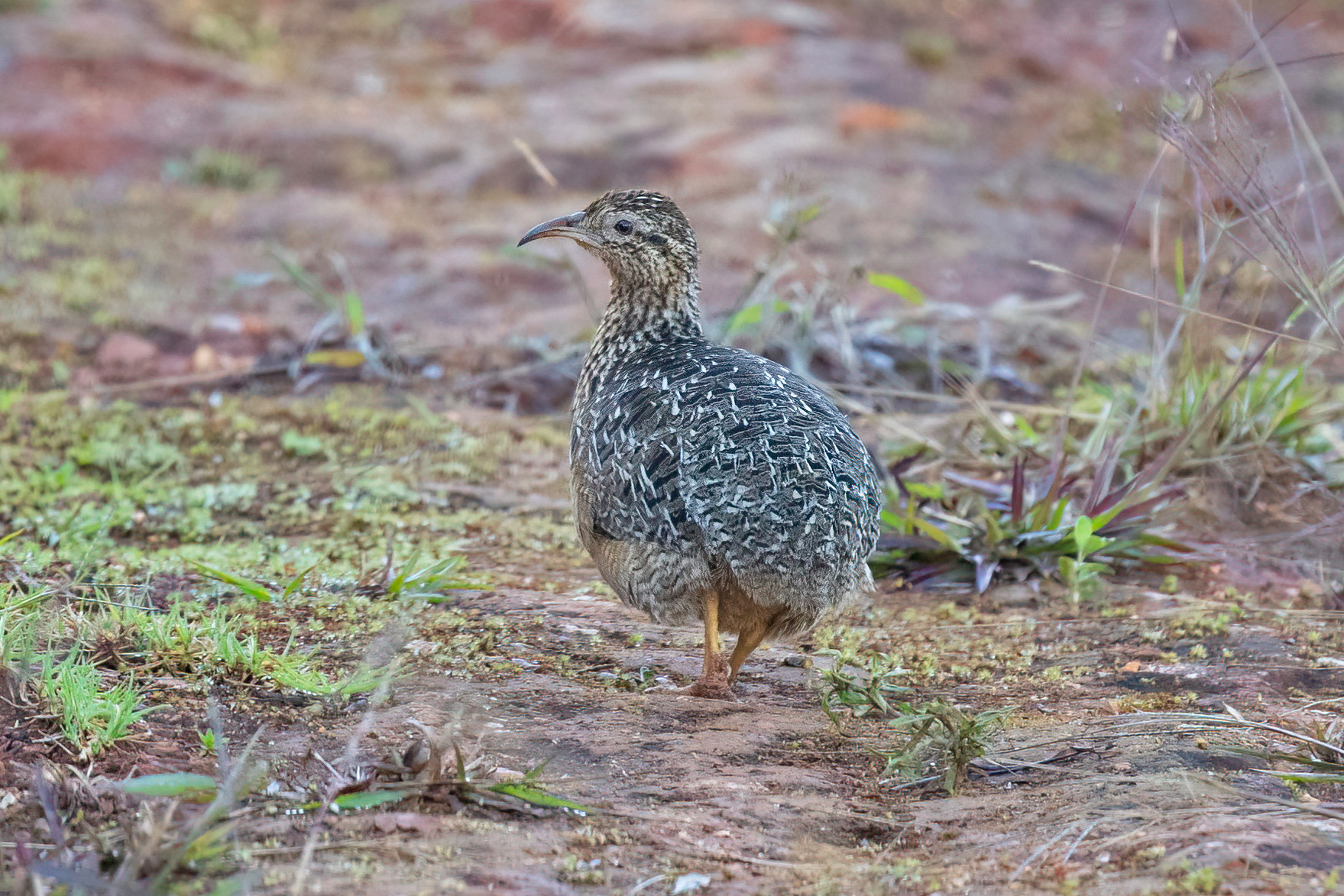

Conservation status
- Least Concern (IUCN 3.1)

Scientific classification
- Kingdom: Animalia
- Phylum: Chordata
- Class: Aves
- Infraclass: Palaeognathae
- Order: Tinamiformes
- Family: Tinamidae
- Genus: Nothoprocta
- Species: N. curvirostris

Binomial name
- Nothoprocta curvirostris Sclater & Salvin, 1873

Subspecies
- N. c. curvirostris Sclater, PL & Salvin, 1873; N. c. peruviana (Taczanowski, 1886)

= Curve-billed tinamou =

Species of bird

The curve-billed tinamou (Nothoprocta curvirostris) is a type of tinamou commonly found in high-altitude grassland and shrubland habitats in the Andes of South America.

== Etymology ==
Crypturellus is formed from three Latin or Greek words. kruptos meaning covered or hidden, oura meaning tail, and ellus meaning diminutive. Therefore, Crypturellus means small hidden tail.

== Taxonomy ==
All tinamou are from the family Tinamidae, and in the larger scheme are also ratites. Unlike other ratites, tinamous can fly, although in general, they are not strong fliers. All ratites evolved from prehistoric flying birds, and tinamous are the closest living relative of these birds.

=== Subspecies ===
The curve-billed tinamou has two subspecies as follows:

- N. c. curvirostris, the nominate race, occurs in the Andes of central and southern Ecuador and northern Peru (Cordillera del Condor)
- N. c. peruviana occurs in the Andes of northern and central Peru; eastern Piura, Cajamarca, Amazonas, western San Martín, La Libertad, Ancash, and Huánuco Regions

=== Characteristics ===
The curve-billed tinamou is approximately 28 cm (11 in) in length. Its upper parts are dark brown streaked with white and spotted with black. Its breast is rufous and spotted with white, its belly is tawny-buff and its crown is black, the sides of its head, and its throat and foreneck are white. Finally, its legs are brown in color.

== Behavior ==
Like other tinamous, the curve-billed tinamou eats fruit off the ground or low-lying bushes. They also eat small amounts of invertebrates, flower buds, tender leaves, seeds, and roots. The male incubates the eggs which may come from as many as 4 different females, and then will raise them until they are ready to be on their own, usually 2–3 weeks. The nest is located on the ground in dense brush or between raised root buttresses.

== Range and habitat ==
This tinamou lives in the Andes of central and southern Colombia, through Ecuador and northern and central Peru. It prefers grassland at 2,800 to 3,700 m (9,200–12,100 ft) in altitude. It also can be found in high-altitude shrubland and pasture.

== Conservation ==
The IUCN list this species as Least Concern, with an occurrence range of 30,000 km^{2} (12,000 sq mi).
