= Barred tinamou =

Conservation status
- Least Concern (IUCN 3.1)

Scientific classification
- Kingdom: Animalia
- Phylum: Chordata
- Class: Aves
- Infraclass: Palaeognathae
- Order: Tinamiformes
- Family: Tinamidae
- Genus: Crypturellus
- Species: C. casiquiare

Binomial name
- Crypturellus casiquiare (Chapman, 1929)

Species of bird

The barred tinamou (Crypturellus casiquiare) is a type of tinamou commonly found in lowland moist forest in subtropical and tropical regions of northern South America.

== Taxonomy ==
This is a monotypic species. All tinamou are from the family Tinamidae, and in the larger scheme are also ratites. Unlike other ratites, tinamous can fly, although in general, they are not strong fliers. All ratites evolved from prehistoric flying birds, and tinamous are the closest living relative of these birds.

== Etymology ==
Crypturellus is formed from three Latin or Greek words. kruptos meaning covered or hidden, oura meaning tail, and ellus meaning diminutive. Therefore, Crypturellus means small hidden tail.

== Description ==
The barred tinamou is approximately 25 cm (9.8 in) in length. It is yellowish-buff with heavy bars of black on its back, its throat is white, its front and sides of neck and breast are pale grey, its belly is white, its flanks are cream barred with black, and its head and neck are chestnut in color with legs that are olive-green. The female is paler on back.

== Behavior ==
Like other tinamous, the barred tinamou eats fruit off the ground or low-lying bushes. They also eat small amounts of invertebrates, flower buds, tender leaves, seeds, and roots. The male incubates the eggs which may come from as many as 4 different females, and then will raise them until they are ready to be on their own, usually 2–3 weeks. The nest is located on the ground in dense brush or between raised root buttresses.

== Range and habitat ==
It prefers to live in tropical and sub-tropical lowland forests at an altitude of 100 to 200 m (330–660 ft) or lower. This species is native to eastern Colombia and southern Venezuela.

== Conservation ==
The IUCN classifies the barred tinamou as Least Concern, with an occurrence range of 49,000 km^{2} (19,000 sq mi).
