= Tepui tinamou =

Conservation status
- Least Concern (IUCN 3.1)

Scientific classification
- Kingdom: Animalia
- Phylum: Chordata
- Class: Aves
- Infraclass: Palaeognathae
- Order: Tinamiformes
- Family: Tinamidae
- Genus: Crypturellus
- Species: C. ptaritepui

Binomial name
- Crypturellus ptaritepui Zimmer & Phelps, 1945

Species of bird

The tepui tinamou (Crypturellus ptaritepui) is a type of ground bird found in montane moist forest on tepuis, in southeastern Venezuela.

== Taxonomy ==
This is a monotypic species. All tinamou are from the family Tinamidae, and in the larger scheme are also ratites. Unlike other ratites, tinamous can fly, although in general, they are not strong fliers. All ratites evolved from prehistoric flying birds, and tinamous are the closest living relative of these birds.

== Etymology ==
Crypturellus is formed from two Greek roots: κρυπτός (kruptos) meaning 'covered' or 'hidden' and ουρά (oura) meaning 'tail'; the Latin suffix -ellus is diminutive. Thus, Crypturellus means 'little hidden tail'.

== Description ==
The tepui tinamou is approximately 27 cm (11 in) in length. The top of its head and rear of neck are rufous brown, darker on its back, and dusky below with rufous sheen on its upper breast. The sides of its head and throat are grey in color, its upper mandible is black, its lower mandible yellow with black tip, and its legs are olive in color.

== Behavior ==
Like other tinamous, the tepui eats fruit off the ground or low-lying bushes. They also eat small amounts of invertebrates, flower buds, tender leaves, seeds, and roots. The male incubates the eggs which may come from as many as 4 different females, and then will raise them until they are ready to be on their own, usually 2–3 weeks. The nest is located on the ground in dense brush or between raised root buttresses.

== Range and habitat ==
The tepui tinamou has been found on Ptari-tepuí, Auyán-tepuí, Chimantá-tepuí, and Sororopán-tepuí, in southeastern Bolívar, Venezuela. It was found in between 1,350 to 1,800 m (4,430–5,910 ft) in elevation, and its preferred habitat is tropical moist montane forest or tropical moist shrubland.

== Conservation ==
The IUCN classifies it as Least Concern, with an occurrence range of 1,000 km^{2} (390 sq mi). It is a protected species in Venezuela.
