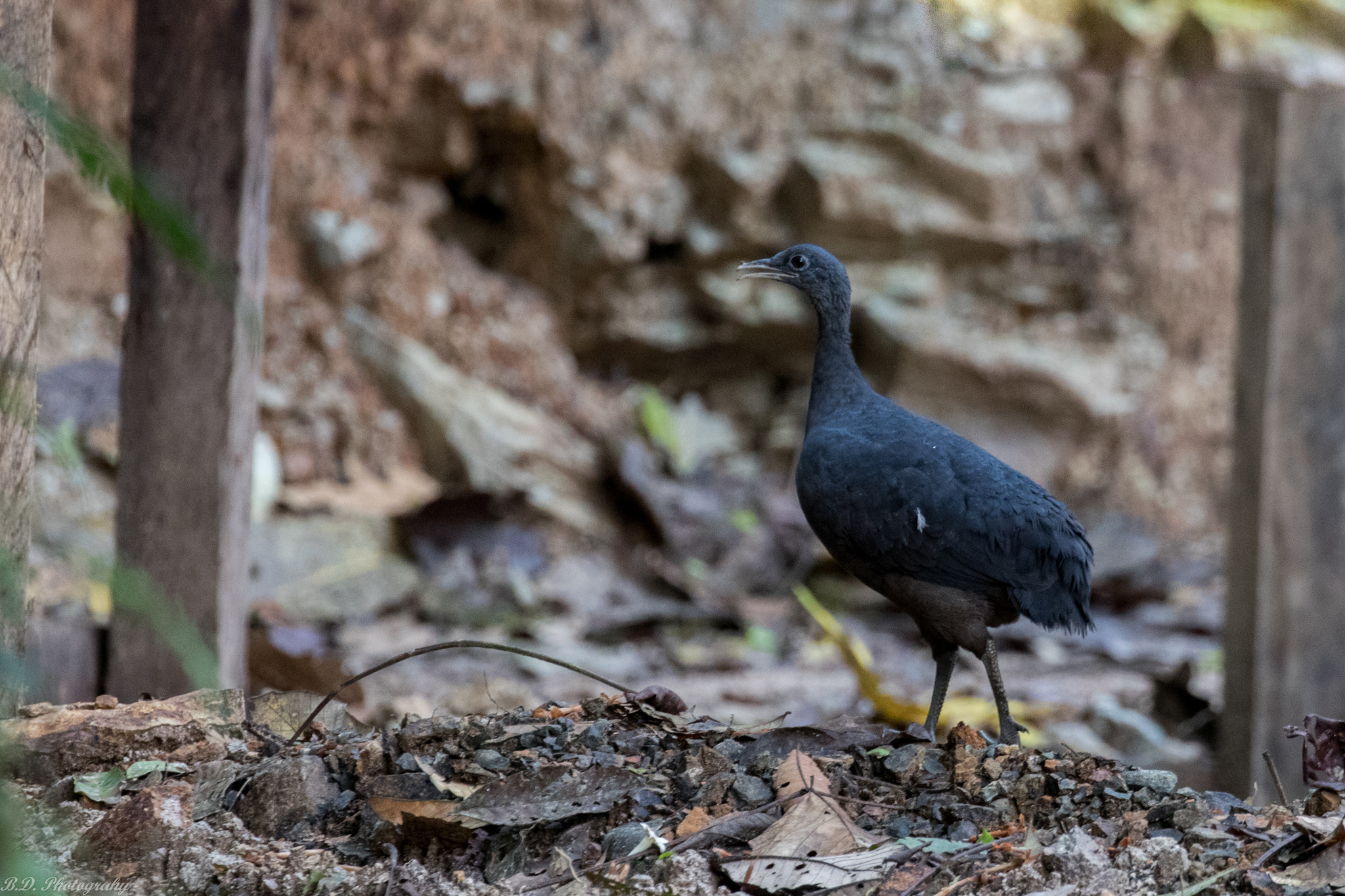

Conservation status
- Vulnerable (IUCN 3.1)

Scientific classification
- Kingdom: Animalia
- Phylum: Chordata
- Class: Aves
- Infraclass: Palaeognathae
- Order: Tinamiformes
- Family: Tinamidae
- Genus: Tinamus
- Species: T. osgoodi

Binomial name
- Tinamus osgoodi Conover, 1949

Subspecies
- T. o. osgoodi Conover, 1949; T. o. herskovitzi Blake, 1953

= Black tinamou =

Species of bird

The black tinamou (Tinamus osgoodi) is a species of ground bird found in humid foothill and montane forest in the Andes of South America.

== Taxonomy ==
All tinamous are from the family Tinamidae and members of the infraclass Palaeognathae. Tinamous are the only members of their infraclass that are not ratites, and can even fly, albeit poorly. All paleognaths evolved from prehistoric flying birds, and tinamous are the closest living relative of these birds. This species of tinamou was first described by Henry Boardman Conover in 1949 based on a specimen from Cusco in Peru.

It has two subspecies:

- T. o. hershkovitzi: Almost entirely restricted to the Colombian Andes, where found at altitudes between 1,400 and 2,100 m (4,600 and 6,900 ft). It is known from the west slope of the East Andes in the Huila Department, and San José de la Fragua on the east slope of the East Andes in the Caquetá Department. Reports from the northern Central Andes in the Antioquia Department in Colombia, and the north-eastern Andes in the Napo and Sucumbíos Provinces in Ecuador likely also involve this subspecies.
- T. o. osgoodi: Found on the east slope of the Peruvian Andes in Cuzco, Puno, Madre de Dios, and Huánuco. It is mainly found at altitudes of 900 to 1,400 m (3,000 to 4,600 ft), but locally occurs up to 2,100 m (6,900 ft).

== Description ==
The black tinamou is a stocky terrestrial bird with a short tail and rounded wings. It is comparatively larger than other tinamous and tends to be about 40 to 46 cm (16–18 in) long, with females being a little larger than males. A male black tinamou has an average wingspan of about 234 to 248 mm (9.2–9.8 in), and a female black tinamou has an average wingspan of 239 to 256 mm (9.4–10.1 in). While there is no record of the average mass of a black tinamou, a male specimen weighing 1,285 g (45.3 oz) has been examined at the Field Museum of Natural History. It is primarily slate grey, rather than truly black as its name would imply. The upperparts of an adult black tinamou are a uniform grey, while its midsection and greater wing coverts are sometimes edged with brown. Its lower breasts and flanks are a sooty brown color, as well as its belly. It has a rufescent vent, which may or may not have black speckling, depending on the subspecies. Its maxilla is black, and its mandible is a light grey. The black tinamou has blue-grey legs and dark brown eyes. An adolescent black tinamou is similar in color, but with whitish spots on the coverts of its wings. Black tinamou chicks generally have a light brown head with a broad, cinnamon-brown stripe extending from the crest of their heads to the napes of their necks. They have whitish throats and chins. Their neck, upper back and upper breast are a dusty brown. A black tinamou chick's lower back and rump is a dirty buff color, and its lower breast and belly range from dusky brown to pale brown.

The black tinamou has a tremulous and descending whistle lasting about one second. The whistle is similar to that of a white-throated tinamou, even sharing the same first note.

== Behavior ==
Virtually nothing is known about the behavior of the black tinamou, but it is likely similar to that of its relatives. Nuts have been found in the crop of one specimen.

=== Reproduction ===
The only nest known was on the ground and contained 2 glossy blue eggs. In Peru, adults in breeding condition have been recorded between March and November, and a chick was found in February.

== Conservation ==
The black tinamou is rated as Vulnerable by the IUCN with a range occurrence of 11,600 km^{2} (4,500 sq mi). In 2004 it was estimated that fewer than 10,000 remained. There are few recent records from Colombia. It was formerly described as locally common in Peru, but is now rare in that country. The black tinamou has been recorded in several reserves, notably the Megantoni National Sanctuary, Manú National Park and Sira Communal Reserve in Peru, Sumaco Napo-Galeras National Park in Ecuador, and the Cueva de los Guácharos National Park in Colombia.

The black tinamou is threatened by deforestation or loss of habitat caused by human settlement expansion, agricultural expansion, road-building, oil exploration in Peru, and it is hunted for food. Even within reserves, hunting and habitat loss are ongoing.
