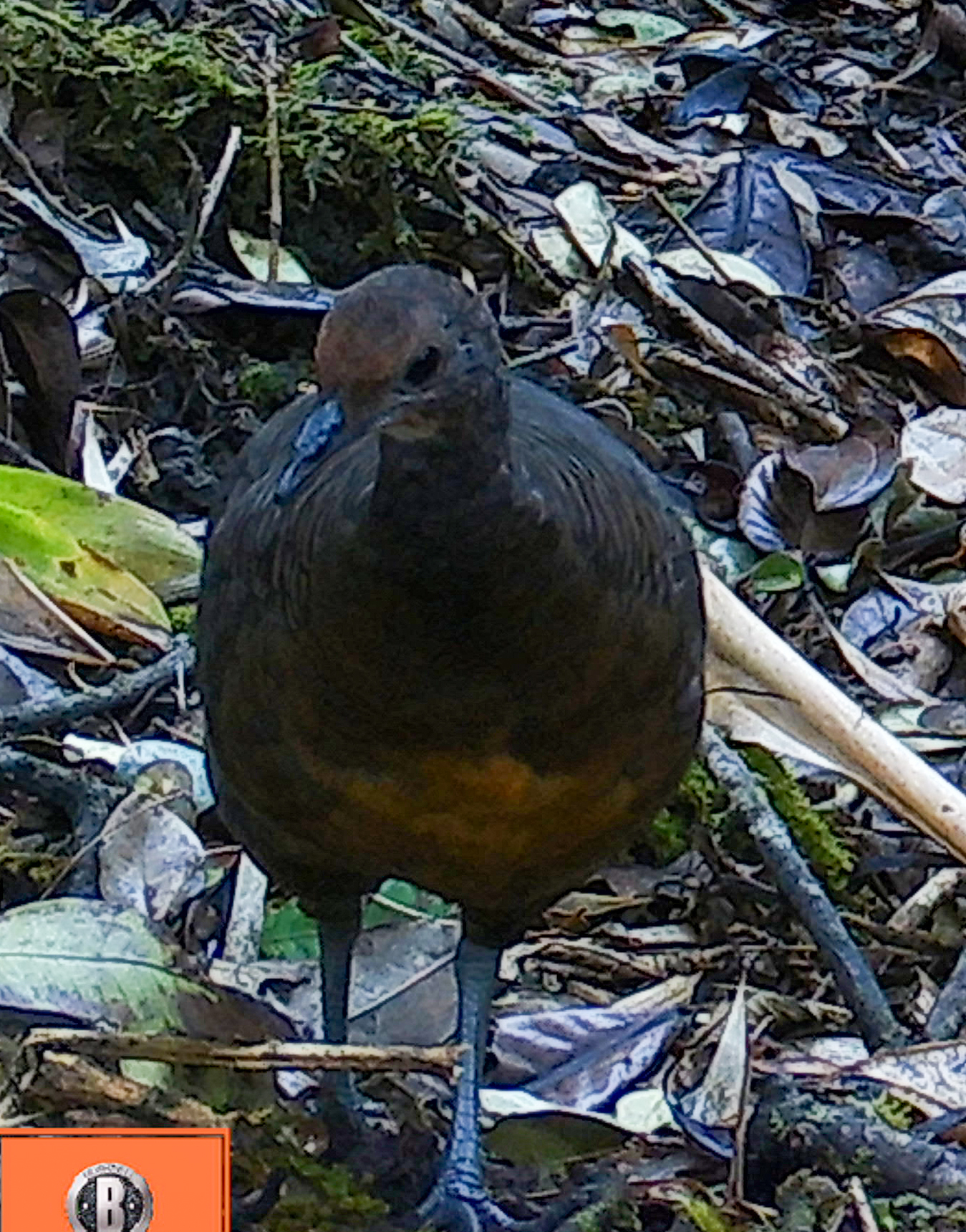

Conservation status
- Least Concern (IUCN 3.1)

Scientific classification
- Kingdom: Animalia
- Phylum: Chordata
- Class: Aves
- Infraclass: Palaeognathae
- Order: Tinamiformes
- Family: Tinamidae
- Genus: Nothocercus
- Species: N. julius

Binomial name
- Nothocercus julius (Bonaparte, 1854)

Synonyms
- Tinamus julius Bonaparte, 1854

= Tawny-breasted tinamou =

Species of bird

The tawny-breasted tinamou (Nothocercus julius) is a type of ground bird found in montane moist forest. Their range is northwestern South America.

== Taxonomy ==
All tinamou are from the family Tinamidae, and in the larger scheme are also ratites. Unlike other ratites, tinamous can fly, although in general, they are not strong fliers. All ratites evolved from prehistoric flying birds, and tinamous are the closest living relative of these birds. The species is named after Jules Verreaux.

== Description ==
The tawny-breasted tinamou has brown upperparts barred with black, and its wings have buff spots. Below its bright chestnut head, it has a white throat. Its breast and flanks are olivaceous brown, while the rest of its underparts are bright rufous. This tinamou measures 35.5–38 cm (14.0–15.0 in) in length.

== Behavior ==
Like other tinamous, the tawny-breasted eats fruit off the ground or low-lying bushes. They also eat small amounts of invertebrates, flower buds, tender leaves, seeds, and roots. The male incubates the eggs which may come from as many as 4 different females, and then will raise them until they are ready to be on their own, usually 2–3 weeks. The nest is located on the ground in dense brush or between raised root buttresses.

== Range ==
This species is native to the Andes in far western Venezuela, central Colombia, Ecuador, and southern Peru.

== Habitat ==
The tawny-breasted tinamou is a type of ground bird found in montane moist forest from 880 to 2,350 m (2,890–7,710 ft) altitude.

== Conservation ==
The tawny-breasted tinamou is listed as Least Concern by the IUCN, and has an estimated global extent of occurrence of 110,000 km^{2} (42,000 sq mi).
