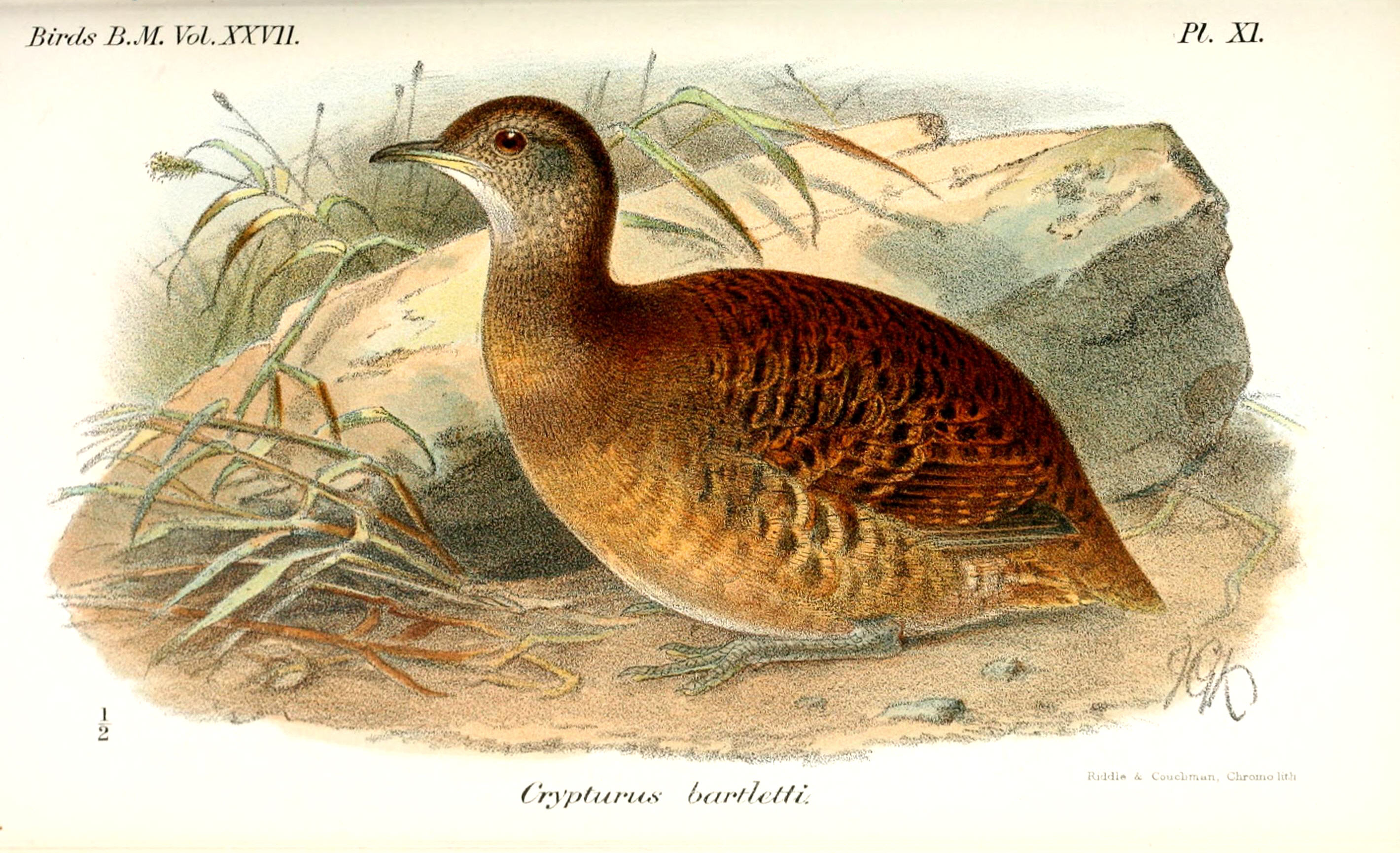

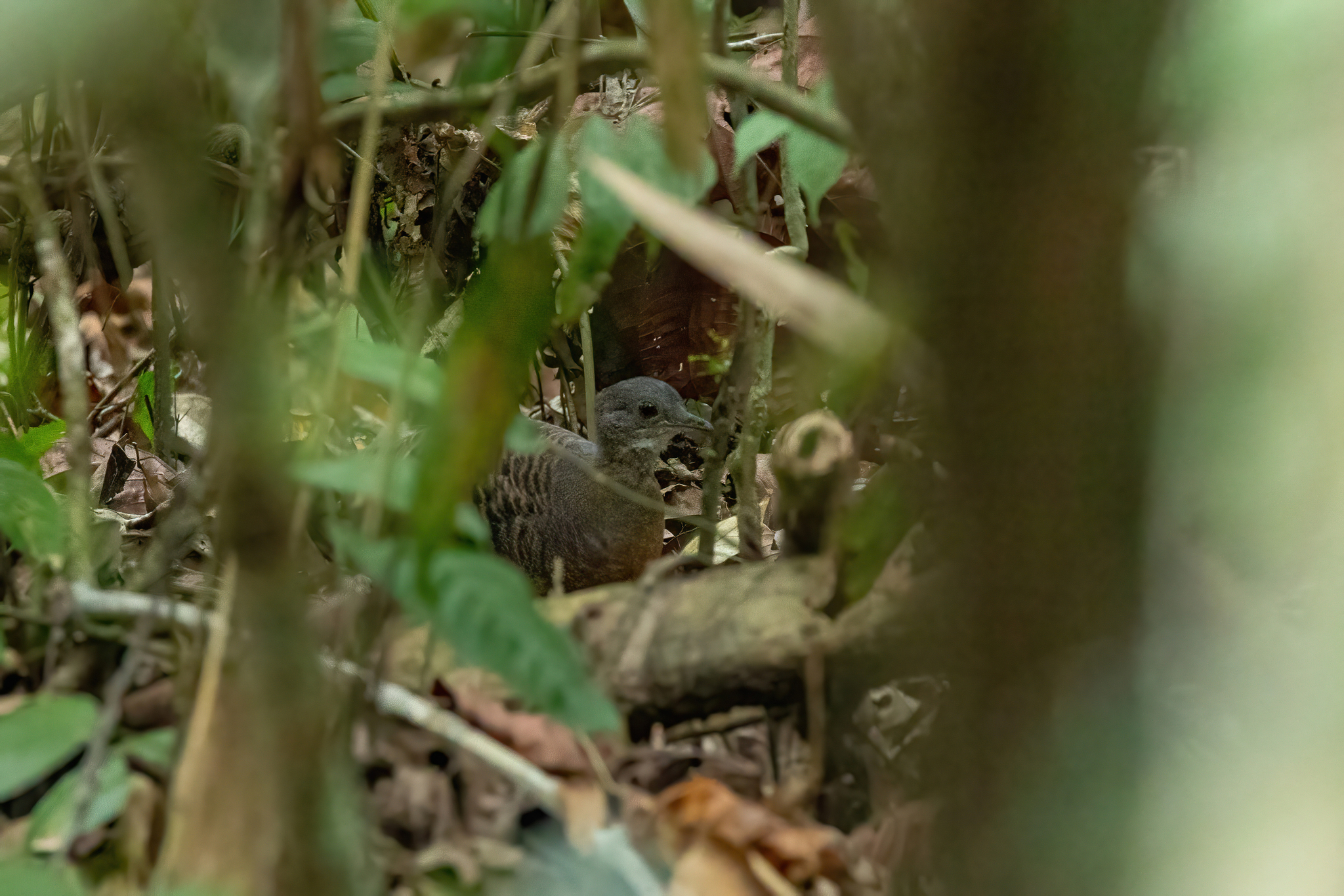

Conservation status
- Least Concern (IUCN 3.1)

Scientific classification
- Kingdom: Animalia
- Phylum: Chordata
- Class: Aves
- Infraclass: Palaeognathae
- Order: Tinamiformes
- Family: Tinamidae
- Genus: Crypturellus
- Species: C. bartletti

Binomial name
- Crypturellus bartletti (Sclater, PL & Salvin, 1873)

Synonyms
- Crypturus bartletti

= Bartlett's tinamou =

Species of bird

Bartlett's tinamou (Crypturellus bartletti) is a type of tinamou found in lowland forest in South America.

== Taxonomy ==
The Bartlett's tinamou is a monotypic species. All tinamou are from the family Tinamidae, and in the larger scheme are also ratites. Unlike other ratites, tinamous can fly, although in general, they are not strong fliers. All ratites evolved from prehistoric flying birds, and tinamous are the closest living relative of these birds.

== Etymology ==
Crypturellus is formed from three Latin or Greek words. Kruptos meaning covered or hidden, oura meaning tail, and ellus meaning diminutive. Therefore, Crypturellus means small hidden tail. Bartletti comes from the Latin form of Bartlett to commemorate Edward Bartlett.

== Range and habitat ==
Bartlett's tinamou is found in swamp and lowland forest in subtropical and tropical regions up to 500 m (1,600 ft) in altitude. This species is native to western Amazonian Brazil, northern Bolivia, and eastern Peru, in South America. It is also found in eastern Ecuador. Over its range, it is considered uncommon.

== Description ==
Bartlett's tinamou is approximately 27 cm (11 in) in length. Its upperparts are brown above barred with black, throat and belly are white, remainder of underparts are rufous, flanks are barred black, and its crown is blackish.

== Behavior ==
Like other tinamous, Bartlett's tinamou eats fruit off the ground or low-lying bushes. They also eat small amounts of invertebrates, flower buds, tender leaves, seeds, and roots. The male incubates the eggs which may come from as many as 4 different females, and then will raise them until they are ready to be on their own, usually 2–3 weeks. The nest is located on the ground in dense brush or between raised root buttresses.

== Conservation ==
The IUCN classify this tinamou as Least Concern, with an occurrence range of 1,990,000 km^{2} (770,000 sq mi).
