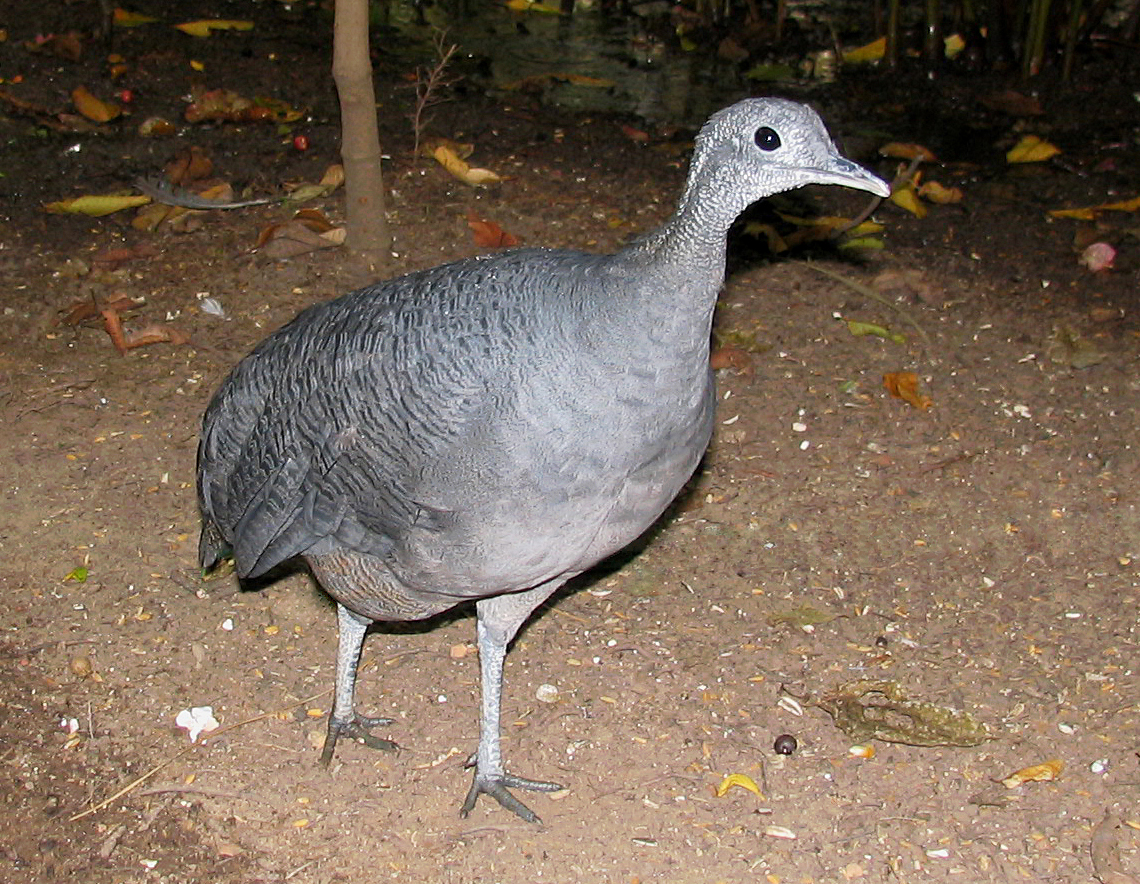

Conservation status
- Vulnerable (IUCN 3.1)

Scientific classification
- Kingdom: Animalia
- Phylum: Chordata
- Class: Aves
- Infraclass: Palaeognathae
- Order: Tinamiformes
- Family: Tinamidae
- Genus: Tinamus
- Species: T. tao

Binomial name
- Tinamus tao Temminck, 1815

Subspecies
- T. t. larensis (Phelps & Phelps, 1949); T. t. tao (Temminck, 1815); T. t. kleei (Tschudi, 1843); T. t. septentrionalis (Brabourne & Chubb, 1913)

= Grey tinamou =

Species of bird

The grey tinamou (Tinamus tao) is a type of ground bird native to South America. Four subspecies are recognised.

== Taxonomy ==
All tinamou are from the family Tinamidae, and in the larger scheme are also ratites. All ratites evolved from prehistoric flying birds, and tinamous are the closest living relative of these birds.

The grey tinamou has several subspecies:

- T. t. larensis with a range in the montane forests of central Colombia and northwestern Venezuela.
- T. t. kleei with a range of south-central Colombia, eastern Ecuador, eastern Peru, eastern Bolivia, and western Brazil.
- T. t. septentrionalis with a range of northeastern Venezuela and possibly northwestern Guyana.
- T. t. tao with a range of north central Brazil, far eastern Peru, and far northwestern Bolivia.

== Description ==
The gray tinamou is believed to be the largest species among the tinamous. Reported total length is from 41.5 to 49 cm (16.3 to 19.3 in) and possibly as much as 53 cm (21 in). In body mass, males may scale from 1,325 to 1,863 g (2.921 to 4.107 lb), averaging 1,565 g (3.450 lb), and females can weigh from 1,430 to 2,080 g (3.15 to 4.59 lb), averaging 1,636 g (3.607 lb) and possibly weighing as much as 2,300 g (5.1 lb). As suggested by its name, it is mostly grey. The back and head are barred blackish, and its vent is cinnamon. White spotting extends along the head and down the neck.

== Distribution and habitat ==
The grey tinamou is found throughout western and northern Brazil, eastern Ecuador, eastern Peru, Colombia east of the Andes, northern Venezuela, northern Bolivia, and Guyana.

In most of its range it is essentially restricted to humid lowland forests, but in the northern and far western parts of its range it mainly occurs in montane forests. This tinamou has shown the ability to utilize forests that have been cleared by logging. As most other tinamous, its song is commonly heard, but it is shy and only infrequently seen.

== Behavior ==
Like other tinamous, the male incubates the eggs on the nest that is located in heavy brush on the ground. After incubation, the male will also raise them for the short period of time until they are ready. They eat fruit and seeds from the ground and bushes that are low to the ground.

== Conservation ==
This species was previously considered by the IUCN to be a Least Concern status, and has a range occurrence of 3,600,000 km^{2} (1,400,000 sq mi) In 2012 it was uplisted to vulnerable.
