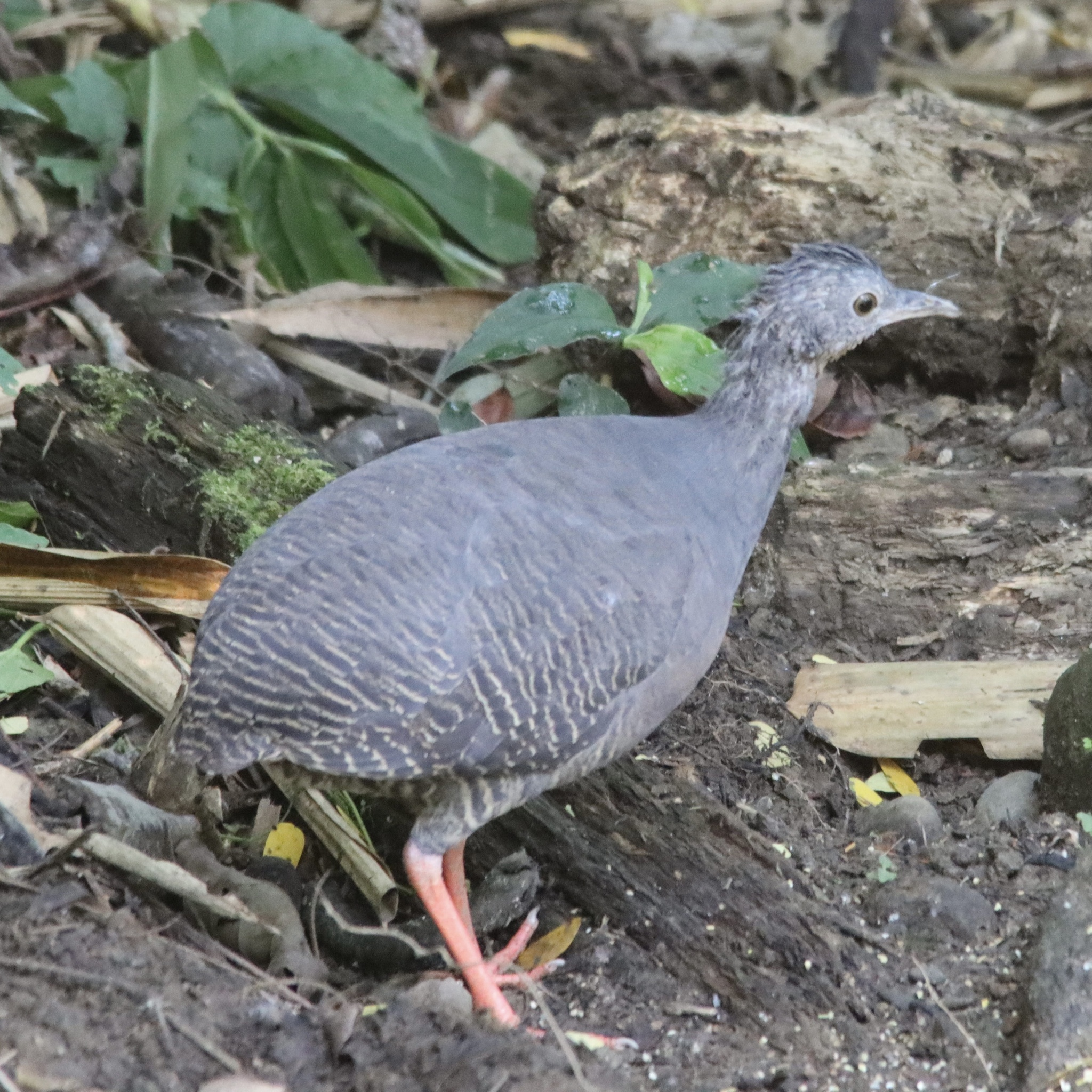

Conservation status
- Least Concern (IUCN 3.1)

Scientific classification
- Kingdom: Animalia
- Phylum: Chordata
- Class: Aves
- Infraclass: Palaeognathae
- Order: Tinamiformes
- Family: Tinamidae
- Genus: Crypturellus
- Species: C. atrocapillus

Binomial name
- Crypturellus atrocapillus (Tschudi, 1844)

Subspecies
- C. a. atrocapillus Tschudi 1844; C a. garleippi Berlepsch 1892

= Black-capped tinamou =

Species of bird

The black-capped tinamou (Crypturellus atrocapillus) is a type of tinamou commonly found in the moist forest lowlands in subtropical and tropical regions.

== Taxonomy ==
All tinamou are from the family Tinamidae, and in the larger scheme are also ratites. Unlike other ratites, tinamous can fly, although in general, they are not strong fliers. All ratites evolved from prehistoric flying birds, and tinamous are the closest living relative of these birds.

The black-capped tinamou has two subspecies as follows:

- C. a. atrocapillus, nominate race, occurs in the lowlands of southeastern Peru.
- C. a. garleppi in the lowlands of northern Bolivia.

== Etymology ==
Crypturellus is formed from three Latin or Greek words. kruptos meaning "covered" or "hidden", oura meaning "tail", and ellus meaning "diminutive". Therefore, Crypturellus means small hidden tail.

== Description ==
The black-capped tinamou is approximately 28 to 30 cm (11–12 in) in length. Its upper-parts are brown, mottled and barred blackish, throat and neck are rufescent, breast is dark grey, and the remainder of underparts are cinnamon to buff. Its cap is blackish and legs could be pale red or bright red. The females are more heavily barred above.

== Behavior ==
Like other tinamous, the black-capped eats fruit off the ground or low-lying bushes. They also eat small amounts of invertebrates, flower buds, tender leaves, seeds, and roots. The male incubates the eggs which may come from as many as 4 different females, and then will raise them until they are ready to be on their own, usually 2–3 weeks. The nest is located on the ground in dense brush or between raised root buttresses.

== Range and habitat ==
It is found in moist forest lowlands in subtropical and tropical regions up to 900 m (3,000 ft) altitude. This species is native to southeastern Peru and northern Bolivia. It has recently been recorded in Brazil.

== Conservation ==
It has an estimated global extent of occurrence of 120,000 km^{2} (46,000 sq mi). It is rated as least concern status by the IUCN
