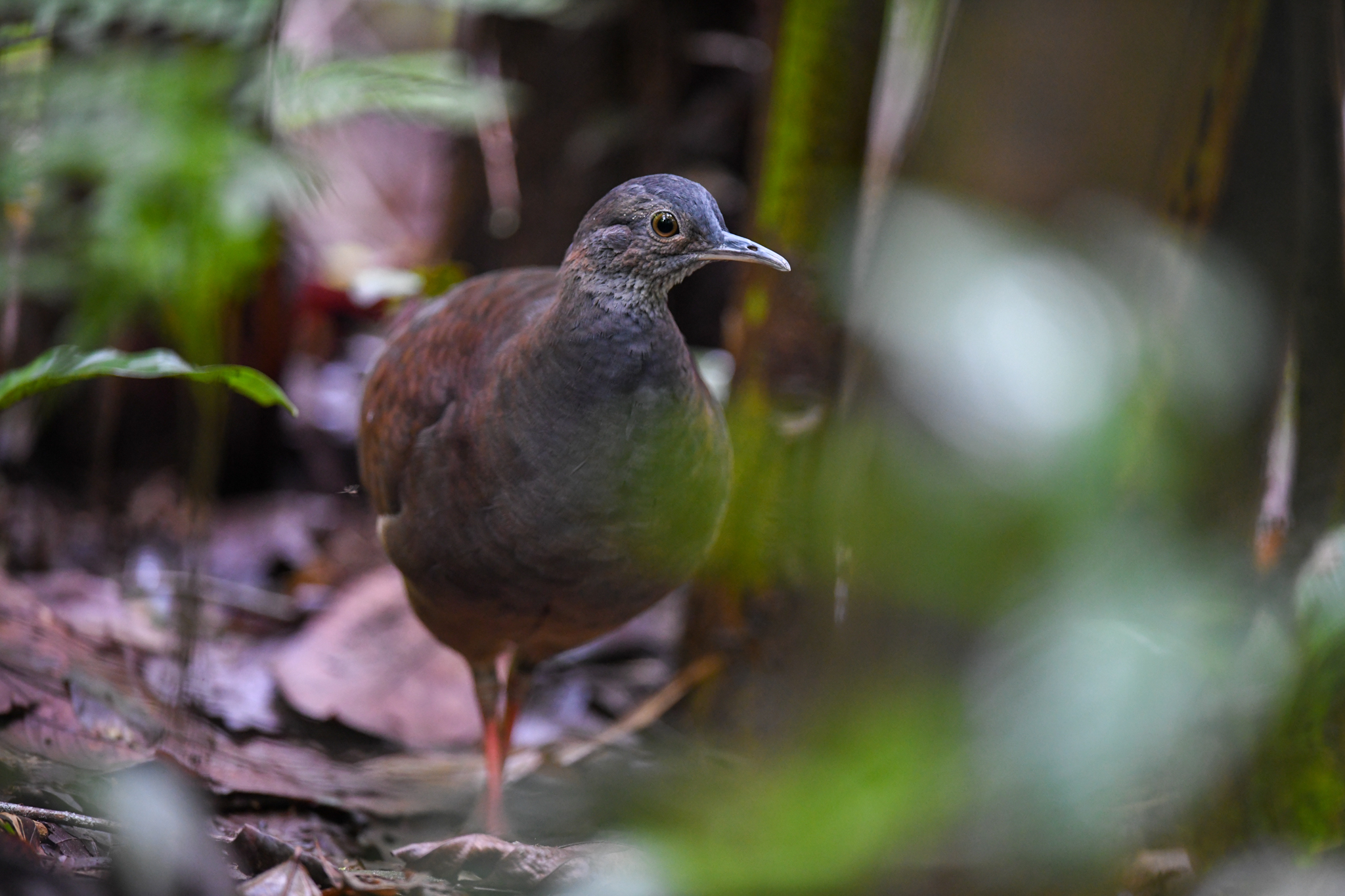

Conservation status
- Vulnerable (IUCN 3.1)

Scientific classification
- Kingdom: Animalia
- Phylum: Chordata
- Class: Aves
- Infraclass: Palaeognathae
- Order: Tinamiformes
- Family: Tinamidae
- Genus: Crypturellus
- Species: C. boucardi

Binomial name
- Crypturellus boucardi (Sclater, PL, 1860)

Subspecies
- C. b. boucardi (Sclater, 1859); C. b. costaricensis (Dwight & Griscom, 1924)

Synonyms
- Tinamus boucardi

= Slaty-breasted tinamou =

Species of bird

The slaty-breasted tinamou or Boucard's tinamou (Crypturellus boucardi) is a type of tinamou commonly found in lowland moist forests of Mexico and Central America.

== Taxonomy ==
All tinamou are from the family Tinamidae, and in the larger scheme are also ratites. Unlike other ratites, tinamous can fly, although in general, they are not strong fliers. All ratites evolved from prehistoric flying birds, and tinamous are the closest living relative of these birds.

The slaty-breasted tinamou has two sub-species:

- C. b. boucardi (the nominate subspecies) ranges along the lowlands of the Gulf of Mexico and Caribbean coast in southeastern Mexico, Belize, Guatemala, and northwestern Honduras
- C. b. costaricensis ranges on the Caribbean slope in Honduras, Nicaragua, and northern Costa Rica

Philip Sclater identified the slaty-breasted tinamou from a specimen from Oaxaca, Mexico, in 1859.

== Etymology ==
Crypturellus can be broken down into the following: kruptos meaning covered or hidden, oura meaning the tail and ellus meaning diminutive. Therefore, Crypturellus means the small covered tail. Finally, boucardi is the Latin form of Boucard to commemorate Adolphe Boucard.

== Range and habitat ==
=== Range ===
It is commonly found in lowland moist forest in subtropical and tropical regions up to 700 m (2,300 ft) in altitude, though may occasionally be found at elevation up to 1,500 m in its Mexican range. This species ranges along the Gulf of Mexico coast from southern Mexico, from southern Veracruz and northern Oaxaca south, to northern Costa Rica. Mexico, Belize, Guatemala, Honduras, Nicaragua and Costa Rica.

=== Habitat ===
It prefers thick evergreen forests with thick undergrowth, but also can be found in thick forests with little undergrowth, secondary forests, and on regenerating plantations. It likes moist areas as well.

== Description ==
The slaty-breasted tinamou averages 27 cm (11 in) in length, and weighs about 470 g (1.04 lb). Its back and head are black to chestnut in color, brown on its wings, slaty grey on its breast, white on its throat, grey-brown on remainder of its underparts with darker barring on flanks and undertail. The female has barring on its wings. Its legs are pink to bright red, and its bill is dark above and yellow below.

== Behavior ==
It is a shy and difficult tinamou to be seen on the dark forest floors. Its call is a three-note call and lower than other tinamous. Its calls can be in long bouts, up to five hours at a time. This tinamou and the thicket tinamou will produce hybrids on occasion.

=== Feeding ===
Like other tinamous, it feeds on fruit and seeds and some invertebrates, in particular, ants and termites.

=== Reproduction ===
The slaty-breasted tinamou male attracts 2 to 4 females to lay in its nest on the ground and in thick vegetation or between the raised roots of a tree. The male incubates and raises the young. Females will mate with more than one male.

== Conservation ==
The IUCN has classified the slaty-breasted as vulnerable and it has an occurrence range of 742,000 km^{2} (286,000 sq mi). The population is currently decreasing rapidly due to overhunting and habitat destruction.
