= Fissuravis =

Fissuravis Temporal range: Paleocene (Selandian)

Scientific classification
- Kingdom: Animalia
- Phylum: Chordata
- Class: Aves
- Infraclass: Palaeognathae
- Order: †Lithornithiformes
- Family: †Lithornithidae
- Genus: †Fissuravis; Mayr, 2007
- Species: †F. weigelti

Binomial name
- †Fissuravis weigelti Mayr, 2007

Extinct genus of birds

Fissuravis ("fissure bird") is a genus of extinct bird from the Paleocene of Germany. A lithornithid, it was closely related to modern ratites, but it was a capable flyer.

== Ecology ==
Hailing from the Walbeck Paleocene deposits, it is found amidst a rich avian fauna, which also included the gigantic Gastornis and the enigmatic ratite Remiornis.

Like most lithornithids, it was probably a very competent flyer, its coracoid remnants suggesting powerful flight musculature, and it likely engaged in a similar style of soaring flight to Lithornis and Pseudocrypturus.
