= Calciavis =

Calciavis Temporal range: 51 Ma Eocene

Scientific classification
- Kingdom: Animalia
- Phylum: Chordata
- Class: Aves
- Infraclass: Palaeognathae
- Order: †Lithornithiformes
- Family: †Lithornithidae
- Genus: †Calciavis; Nesbitt et al. 2016
- Species: †C. grandei

Binomial name
- †Calciavis grandei Nesbitt et al. 2016

Extinct genus of birds

Calciavis is an extinct genus of bird from the Eocene of Wyoming. It is a lithornithid, a member of a lineage of flying palaeognaths, distantly related to modern ratites. Like many other fossils from the Green River Formation, its are exceptionally well preserved, bearing impressions of skin and feathers. Some researchers consider this taxon as a species of Lithornis (L. grandei).

== Discovery and description ==
The original specimen of Calciavis, AMNH 30578, was found in the Fossil Butte Member of the Green River Formation, Wyoming, dating to around 51 million years ago. It is an exceptionally well preserved specimen, preserving most of the post-cranial skeleton aside from the femur and associated pelvic region, as well as soft-tissue impressions of feathers, skin, foot scales and claw sheaths. Another specimen, AMNH 30560 , was found in the vicinity, composed of a similarly complete most mostly disarticulate skeleton.

It is diagnosed by several features of the skull and pelvis as well as having metatarsals IV and II subequal in distal extent. It differs from the contemporary Pseudocrypturus by a shorter skull - in Calciavis the skull is shorter than the humerus, while in inverse happens in Pseudocrypturus -, as well as a proportionally narrower coracoid shaft and longer tarsometatarsus, from Lithornis promiscuus in aspects of the ischium, and from Paracathartes in a less curved and more gracile scapular blade.

Feather imprints show abundant plumage with long primaries and remiges. In AMNH 30578 most of it is damaged due to post-mortem decomposition, with disorganised patches in the pectoral and pelvic region and the left wing traces and impressions being damaged, but the right wing is mostly intact, even showing evidence of barbules; in AMNH AMNH 30560 a wing is similarly well preserved. It is unclear if it had a tail, as the left wing feathers block the caudal region in AMNH 30578, but other lithornithids lack tail feathers.

== Phylogeny ==
Calciavis is recovered as a sister taxa to Pseudocrypturus, as sister-taxa to all other lithornithids.

== Ecology ==
Studies suggest that there was bare minimum of two species-level lithornithids in the Green River Formation at a given time, suggesting a high local diversity. Calciavis indeed co-existed directly at least with Pseudocrypturus, and though both genera/species are the only currently diagnosable lithornithids several other contemporary species probably belong to separate species. Comparisons with other palaeognaths render the possibility of both birds being different sexes of the same species unlikely, and both Calciavis specimens belong to adult birds, not juveniles of Pseudocrypturus.

As mentioned above, skull and limb proportions are different among both species, implying that they occupied different ecological niches.

=== Flight ===
A recent study on Calciavis vindicates previous statements of competent flying in lithornithids, indicating that not only they were capable of sustained flapping but also migratory behaviour.

== See also ==
- Dinosaur coloration
