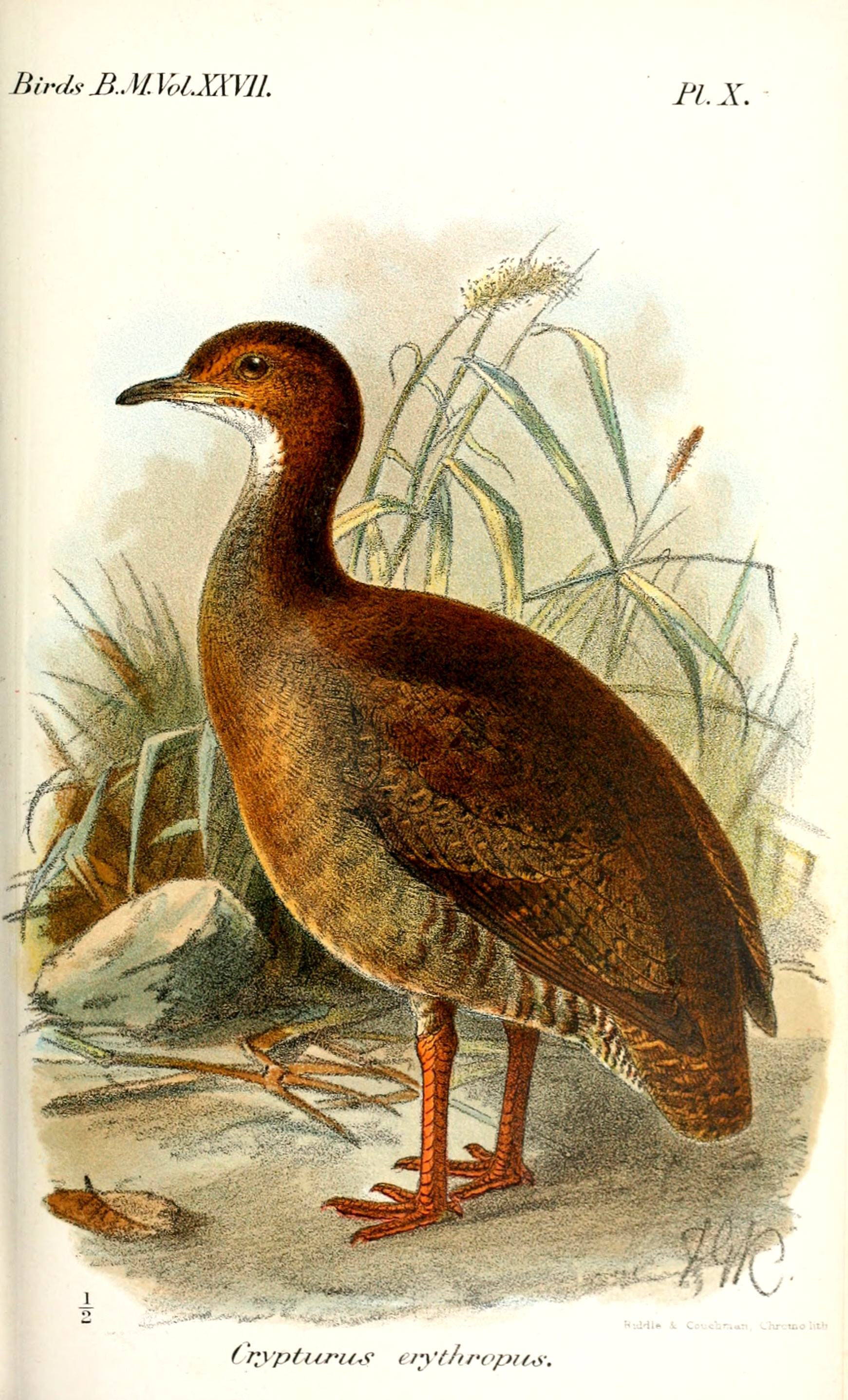
- Illustration by Keulemans, 1895

Conservation status
- Least Concern (IUCN 3.1)

Scientific classification
- Kingdom: Animalia
- Phylum: Chordata
- Class: Aves
- Infraclass: Palaeognathae
- Order: Tinamiformes
- Family: Tinamidae
- Genus: Crypturellus
- Species: C. erythropus

Binomial name
- Crypturellus erythropus (Pelzeln, 1863)

Subspecies
- C. e. erythropus (Pelzeln, 1863); C. e. cursitans (Wetmore & Phelps, 1956); C. e. spencei (Brabourne & Chubb, 1914); C. e. margaritae (Phelps & Phelps, 1948); C. e. saltuarius (Wetmore, 1950); Magdalena Tinamou; C. e. columbianus (Salvadori, 1895); Colombian Tinamou; C. e. idoneus (Todd, 1919); Santa Marta Tinamou

Synonyms
- Crypturus erythropus

= Red-legged tinamou =

Species of bird

The red-legged tinamou or red-footed tinamou, (Crypturellus erythropus) is a ground-dwelling bird found in the tropics and lower subtropics of northern South America.

== Description ==
The red-legged tinamou is superficially similar to a quail to which it is not related as it, along with other tinamous, belongs in the Paleognathae. Its total length is 27 to 32 cm (11–13 in). Its brownish upperparts and grey chest contrasts clearly with the buff belly. The back and wings are barred, but this is faint (often barely visible) in the males. Additionally, the amount of barring to the upperparts varies among the subspecies. It is the only tinamou in its range with rosy-red legs.

== Behavior ==
As other tinamous, it is recorded infrequently, except by its whistling voice. It has been recorded feeding on seeds, berries, snails, and insects. Little is known about its breeding behavior, but the glossy eggs are pale greyish-lavender with a variable amount of pink suffusion.

== Etymology ==
Crypturellus is formed from three Latin or Greek words/parts. kruptos meaning covered or hidden, oura meaning tail, and -ellus a Latin diminutive suffix. Therefore, Crypturellus means small hidden tail.

== Taxonomy ==
All tinamou are from the family Tinamidae, and in the larger scheme are also ratites. Unlike other ratites, tinamous can fly, although in general, they are not strong fliers. All ratites evolved from prehistoric flying birds, and tinamous are the closest living relative of these birds.

Red-legged tinamou subspecies are:

- C. e. erythropus located in eastern Venezuela, Guyana, Suriname, and northeastern Brazil.
- C. e. cursitans located east of the Andes in northern Colombia and northwestern Venezuela.
- C. e. spencei located in northern Venezuela.
- C. e. margaritae located on Margarita Island.
- C. e. saltuarius - Magdalena tinamou located in northeastern Colombia in Sierra de Ocaña.
- C. e. columbianus - Colombian tinamou located in tropical north central Colombia.
- C. e. idoneus - Santa Marta tinamou located in northeastern Colombia and northwestern Venezuela.

The taxonomy, beyond this, remains unclear, with some authorities considering the taxa saltuarius, idoneus, and columbianus as monotypic species rather than subspecies of the red-legged tinamou. The SACC rejected a proposal to elevate these to species status, arguing that the presently available data fail to support the split.

Additionally, several subspecies usually associated with the red-legged tinamou have been associated with other species in the past, especially the thicket tinamou, the Choco tinamou and the yellow-legged tinamou.

== Range and habitat ==
The red-legged tinamou lives in Guyana, Suriname, Colombia, Venezuela and northeastern Brazil, and on Margarita Island. It may also be found in French Guiana. Its favored habitat is dry forest, although it can be found in moist forest and lower elevation shrubland and grasslands. It prefers elevations below 1,300 m (4,300 ft).

== Conservation ==
The red-legged tinamou is uncommon to locally common in most of its range, but the Magdalena tinamou is very rare (perhaps extinct), while the Colombian tinamou is endangered. In both cases the main problem is habitat destruction, but hunting is another issue. The IUCN lists this bird as Least Concern, with an occurrence range of 1,800,000 km^{2} (690,000 sq mi).
