= 1969 in paleontology =

Paleontology or palaeontology is the study of prehistoric life forms on Earth through the examination of plant and animal fossils. This includes the study of body fossils, tracks (ichnites), burrows, cast-off parts, fossilised feces (coprolites), palynomorphs and chemical residues. Because humans have encountered fossils for millennia, paleontology has a long history both before and after becoming formalized as a science. This article records significant discoveries and events related to paleontology that occurred or were published in the year 1969.

== Plants ==
=== Angiosperms ===
Name	Novelty	Status	Authors	Age	Unit	Location	Notes	Images
Dicotylophyllum litseafolia	Comb nov	jr synonym	(MacGinitie) Wolfe	Eocene; Ypresian	Ione Formation "Chalk Bluff Flora" Loc P3324	USA; California	A dicot of uncertain affinity. Moved from Lauropliyllum litseafolia (1941); Moved from Artocarpoides litseafolia (1968). Moved to Republica litseafolia (1987)	

== Molluscs ==
=== Bivalves ===
Name	Novelty	Status	Authors	Age	Unit	Location	Notes	Images
Praenuculidae	Fam nov	Valid	McAlester	Ordovician - Devonian			extinct family of Nuculoidea bivalves	

== Fish ==
=== Actinopterygii ===
Name	Novelty	Status	Authors	Age	Unit	Location	Notes	Images
Proaracana	gen et sp nov	Valid	Le Danois	Eocene	Monte Bolca	Italy		Proaracana dubia

=== Conodonts ===
Name	Novelty	Status	Authors	Age	Location	Notes	Images
Protognathodus	Gen. nov	Valid	Willi Ziegler	351 Millions of years ago.	Austria; China; Germany; UK		
Patrognathus	Gen nov	Valid	Rhodes, Austin & Druce	Carboniferous	Russia; UK		

== Archosauromorphs ==
=== Crurotarsans ===
Name	Novelty	Status	Authors	Age	Location	Notes	Images
Riojasuchus	gen et sp nov	valid	Bonaparte	Late Triassic	Argentina	Ornithosuchid archosaur. originally misidentified as a dinosaur	Riojasuchus tenuiceps

=== Non-avian dinosaurs ===
Data courtesy of George Olshevsky's dinosaur genera list.

Name	Novelty	Status	Authors	Age	Unit	Location	Notes	Images
Deinonychus	gen et sp nov	Valid	Ostrom	Early Cretaceous	Cloverly Formation	USA; Montana	An American dromeosaur, that has a name that means: Terrible Claw .	Deinonychus antirrhopus
Riojasaurus	gen et sp nov	Valid.	Bonaparte	Triassic			A sauropod. The type species is R. incertus	
"Strenusaurus"	gen et sp nov	Junior synonym.	Bonaparte	Triassic			Junior synonym of Riojasaurus.	
"Syntarsus"	gen et sp nov	Preoccupied name.	Raath	Early Jurassic			Preoccupied by Syntarsus Fairmaire, 1869. Renamed Megapnosaurus.	Megapnosaurus rhodesiensis

=== Birds ===
Name	Novelty	Status	Authors	Age	Unit	Location	Notes	Images
Alectoris bavarica	Sp. nov.	Valid	Ballmann	Early Miocene		Germany	A Phasianidae.	
Buteo pusillus	Sp. nov.	Valid	Ballmann	Middle Miocene		France	An Accipitridae.	
Capitonides	Gen. et Sp. nov.	jr synonym	Ballmann	Early Miocene		Germany	A Lybiidae, jr syn of Trachyphonus europeus.	
Diomedea thyridata	Sp. nov.	Valid	Wilkinson	Late Miocene	Black Rock Sandstone	Australia	A Diomedeidae.	
Eogeranoides	Gen. et Sp. nov.	Valid	Cracraft	Early Eocene	Willwood Formation	USA (Wyoming)	A Geranoididae, type sp. E. campivagus.	
Geranodornis	Gen. nov. et Sp. nov.	Valid	Cracraft	Middle Eocene	Bridger Formation	USA (Wyoming)	A Geranoididae type sp. G. aenigma	
Musophaga meini	Sp. nov.	jr synonym	Ballmann	Middle Miocene (MN 8)		France	A Musophagidae jr syn of Veflintornis meini	
Otus wintershofensis	Sp. nov.	jr synonym	Ballmann	Early Miocene		Germany	A Strigidae, transferred Strix wintershofensis.	
Palaeonerpes	Gen. et Sp. nov.	Valid	Cracraft & Morony	Early Pliocene	Valentine Formation	USA (Nebraska)	A Picidae, type sp P. shorti	
Palaeophasianus incompletus	Sp. nov.	Valid	Cracraft	Early Eocene	Willwood Formation	USA (Wyoming)	A Geranoididae	
Paracygnus	Gen. et Sp. nov.	Valid	Short	Late Pliocene	Kimbal Formation	USA (Colorado)	An Anatidae, type sp P. plattensis	
Paragrus shufeldti	Sp. nov.	Valid	Cracraft	Early Eocene	Willwood Formation	USA (Wyoming)	A Geranoididae	
Plotopterum	Gen et Sp. nov.	Valid	Howard	Early Miocene	Upper Walker Formation	USA; California	A Plotopteridae, type sp P. joaquinensis	Plotopterum joaquinensis
Pseudodontornis stirtoni	Sp. nov.	jr synonym	Howard & Warter	Late Pliocene		New Zealand	A Pseudodontornithidae transferred to Neodontornis stirtoni	
Pulsatrix arredondoi	Sp. nov.	valid	Brodkorb	Pleistocene	Caverna Paredones	Cuba	A Strigidae.	
Strix brevis	Sp. nov.	Valid	Ballmann	Early Miocene		Germany	A Strigidae, transferred to Intulula brevis.	
Taoperdix miocaena	Sp. nov.	Valid	Ballmann	Early Miocene		Germany	A Cracidae.	
Tetrao praeurogallus	Sp. nov.	Valid	Dénes Jánossy	Early Pliocene - Early Pleistocene		Bulgaria	A Phasianidae.	
Zenaidura prior	Sp. nov.	jr synonym	Brodkorb	Late Pliocene	Rexroad Formation	USA (Kansas)	A Columbidae, transferred to Zenaida prior.	
Zygodactylus	Gen et Sp. nov.	Valid	Ballmann	Middle Miocene		France Germany	A Zygodactylidae two sp Z. grivensis & Z. ignotus.	

=== Pterosaurs ===
Name	Novelty	Status	Authors	Age	Unit	Location	Notes	Images
Nesodactylus	gen et sp nov	Valid	Colbert	Late Jurassic	Jagua Formation	Cuba	family placement uncertain	

== Synapsids ==
=== Mammals ===
Name	Novelty	Status	Authors	Age	Type Locality	Country	Notes	Images
Crusafontia	Gen et sp nov	valid	Henkel & Krebs	Cretaceous; Barremian		Spain	A dryolestid mammalian The type species is C. cuencana.	Crusafontia cuencana
Sivapardus	Gen. et. sp. nov.	Valid	Bakr	Late Pliocene-Early Pleistocene	Sar-Dhok	Pakistan	A felinae large cat. The type species is S. punjabiensis	

== Paleontologists ==
- Death of Friedrich von Huene, the well known German paleontologist.
