= Geranoididae =

Geranoididae Temporal range: Eocene

Scientific classification
- Kingdom: Animalia
- Phylum: Chordata
- Class: Aves
- Infraclass: Palaeognathae
- Family: †Geranoididae; Wetmore, 1933

Genera
- †Eogeranoides; †Galligeranoides?; †Geranodornis; †Geranoides; †Palaeophasianus; †Paragrus

Extinct family of birds

Geranoididae is a clade of extinct birds from the early to late Eocene and possibly early Oligocene of North America and Europe. These were mid-sized, long-legged flightless birds. Recent research shows that these birds may actually be palaeognaths related to ostriches.

== Classification ==
It is rather unambiguous that geranoidids are either part of or stem representatives of Gruoidea, the clade that includes modern cranes, limpkins and trumpeters, though their precise relationship varies among studies, some recovering them as sister taxa to another clade of flightless ratite-like birds, the eogruiids. The most recent consensus appears to be that geranoidids are outside of Gruoidea, with eogruiids being more closely related to modern cranes. However, Mayr (2019) argued that close affinities between Geranoididae and the palaeognathous family Palaeotididae are at least as well supported as the classification of geranoidids into the Gruiformes.

== Taxonomy ==
The exact number of genera and species are also somewhat controversial. For instance, a recent study recovers Geranoides as possibly synonymous with Palaeophasianus and Eogeranoides as possibly synonymous with Paragrus.

== Paleobiology ==
Most geranoidids appear to have been flightless, with long legs and short wings, and presumably with herbivorous habits, giving them a profile and lifestyle similar to that of modern ratites. Most if not all of them were forest dwellers, a lifestyle also present in contemporaneous ratites such as Palaeotis and Remiornis. While competition and lack thereof between ratites and eogruiids has been examined extensively, niche partitioning between geranoidids and ratites has currently not, in spite of factors like geranoidids being most common in North America, where there are no ratites, or the fact that some European ratites were carnivorous.

== Paleoecology and distribution ==
Geranoidids are most common in Eocene fossil sites in North America, particularly in the Willwood Formation where up to six species are known. Galligeranoides occurs in the Eocene of France in association with another flightless bird, Gastornis, potentially indicating that geranoidids took advantage of land bridges to arrive to Europe. However, Mayr (2019) considered Galligeranoides to be a member of Palaeognathae closely related to Palaeotis, and formally transferred Galligeranoides from the family Geranoididae to the family Palaeotididae. This transfer restricts the fossil record of the family Geranoididae to North America.
