= Santa Marta tinamou =

Scientific classification
- Kingdom: Animalia
- Phylum: Chordata
- Class: Aves
- Infraclass: Palaeognathae
- Order: Tinamiformes
- Family: Tinamidae
- Genus: Crypturellus
- Species: C. erythropus
- Subspecies: C. e. idoneus

Trinomial name
- Crypturellus erythropus idoneus (Todd, 1919)

Synonyms
- Crypturellus idoneus (Todd, 1919)

Subspecies of bird

The Santa Marta tinamou, Crypturellus erythropus idoneus, is a subspecies of tinamou that was recognized as a species by most authorities until 2006. It is found in northern South America.

== Etymology ==
Crypturellus is formed from three Latin or Greek words: kruptos meaning covered or hidden, oura meaning tail, and ellus meaning diminutive. Therefore, Crypturellus means small hidden tail.

== Taxonomy ==
The Santa Marta tinamou is a member of the paleognaths, a group that includes the flightless ratites, with the tinamous being the only family that flies. Up until 2006 they were generally accepted as a separate species; however, that year the SACC rejected a proposal to separate this species out and thus they are now generally regarded as part of Crypturellus erythropus.

== Range ==
They are located in the northwestern portion of Venezuela and northeastern Colombia.
