= Colombian tinamou =

Scientific classification
- Kingdom: Animalia
- Phylum: Chordata
- Class: Aves
- Infraclass: Palaeognathae
- Order: Tinamiformes
- Family: Tinamidae
- Genus: Crypturellus
- Species: C. erythropus
- Subspecies: C. e. columbianus

Trinomial name
- Crypturellus erythropus columbianus (Salvadori, 1895)

Synonyms
- Crypturellus columbianus (Salvadori, 1895)

Subspecies of bird

The Colombian tinamou (Crypturellus erythropus columbianus) is a tinamou found in Córdoba, Sucre, Bolívar, and Antioquia in north-central Colombia. Little is known about it. It occurs in lowland moist forest and shrubland at elevation up to 600 m (2,000 ft).

It is sometimes treated as a distinct species, and sometimes as a subspecies of the red-legged tinamou. The SACC rejected a proposal to elevate it to species status, arguing that the presently available data fail to support the split. BirdLife International followed this treatment; hence the Colombian tinamou has been dropped from the 2007 IUCN Red List.

== Description ==
The Colombian tinamou is approximately 30 cm (12 in) in length. It is a medium-sized brownish tinamou. It has a plain brown crown and white throat. Its upper parts are also plain brown with no barring, white notches in the secondaries and wing coverts. Its underparts are paler brown with dark barring near vent. The legs are pinkish-red in color. The Colombian tinamou looks very similar to the red-legged tinamou (Crypturellus erythropus), however the Colombian tinamou is darker and has stronger barring.

== Status and conservation ==
It is threatened by deforestation of the lowlands forests in its range. In recent years, there has been a very rapid loss of habitat in the northern part of the Cordillera Central and the Serranía de San Lucas, where the remaining populations are concentrated. It was uplisted to Endangered (EN A2c+3c) by the IUCN in 2004, after being assessed as Near Threatened since 1988, but as mentioned above it is no longer included in the Red List, where instead considered a subspecies of the red-legged tinamou.

Currently no conservation measures are known. It has been proposed to survey to determine its precise distribution and ecological requirements, and find suitable habitat to protect these birds.
