= Eogeranoides =

Eogeranoides Temporal range: Early Eocene

Scientific classification
- Kingdom: Animalia
- Phylum: Chordata
- Class: Aves
- Infraclass: Palaeognathae
- Family: †Geranoididae
- Genus: †Eogeranoides; Cracraft, 1969
- Species: †E. campivagus

Binomial name
- †Eogeranoides campivagus Cracraft, 1969

Extinct genus of birds

Eogeranoides is an extinct monospecific and dubious genus of ratite. The type and only known species, Eogeranoides campivagus, described in 1969 by Joel Cracraft, is represented by several fragmentary extremities of leg bones, collected in the Early Eocene Foster Gulch locality of the Willwood Formation in Wyoming. Highly fragmentary, the genus is poorly defined and Gerald Mayr proposed in 2016 that it represent a junior synonym of Paragrus prentici.
