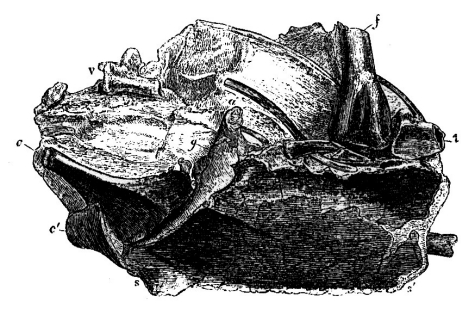
- Woodcut of the L. vulturinus holotype

Scientific classification
- Kingdom: Animalia
- Phylum: Chordata
- Class: Aves
- Infraclass: Palaeognathae
- Order: †Lithornithiformes
- Family: †Lithornithidae
- Genus: †Lithornis; Owen, 1840

Species
- L. celetius Houde, 1988; L. hookeri Harrison, 1984; L. nasi Harrison, 1984; L. plebius Houde, 1988; L. promiscuus Houde, 1988; L. vulturinus Owen, 1840

= Lithornis =

Lithornis Temporal range: Paleocene-Eocene, 56–40 Ma

Extinct genus of birds

Lithornis is a genus of extinct paleognathous birds. Although Lithornis was able to fly well, their closest relatives are the extant tinamous (which are poor flyers) and ratites (which are flightless birds).

Fossils of Lithornis are known with certainty from the Upper Paleocene through the Middle Eocene, but their fossil record may extend to the late Cretaceous. Lithornis is from ancient Greek for 'stone bird', as it is one of the first fossil birds to become widely discussed. Presumably closely related genera are Paracathartes and Pseudocrypturus. Some researchers consider Calciavis as a species of Lithornis (L. grandei).

== Species ==
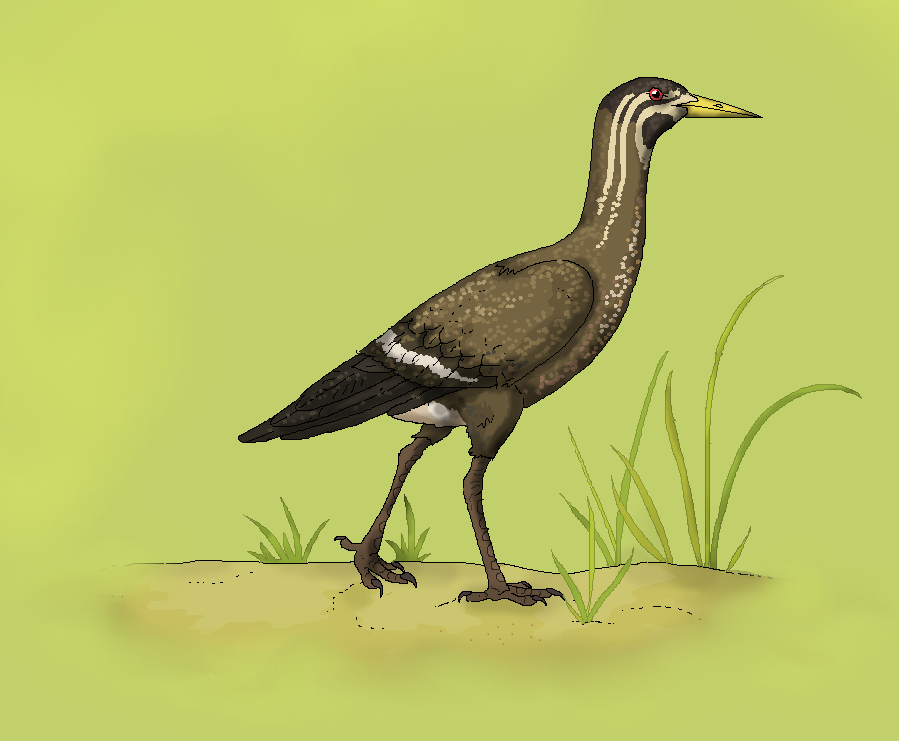
Life restoration.

Six species have been recognized in modern times; undescribed ones are also likely to exist. The supposed tarsometatarsus piece from which "Lithornis" emuinus was described is actually a humerus fragment of the giant pseudotooth bird Dasornis.

=== Lithornis celetius ===
L. celetius is from the Bangtail Quarry, Sedan Quadrangle, Park County, Montana, and was described by Peter Houde (1988). It is from the Fort Union Formation, which is earliest Tiffanian, Late Paleocene. The type fossil is USNM 290601.

L. celetius was of average size for the genus, and the name Celetius is derived from the Greek word keletion a race horse for which the type locality is also named.

=== Lithornis hookeri ===
Harrison and Walker originally labeled the fossil as belonging to the species Pediorallus barbarae in 1977. In 1984, Harrison redescribed the fossil as coming from a new species Pediorallus hookeri, and later that year it was moved to Lithornis hookeri. L. hookeri is the smallest of the Lithornithidae.

=== Lithornis nasi ===
W. George collected the original fossil in the Division A London Clay, North Sea Basin at Walton on the Naze, Essex, England. The fossil was described by Harrison in 1984 as a rail, Pediorallus nasi, but was later moved to Lithornis nasi. L. nasi is larger than L. hookeri and L. plebius. In 2015, L. nasi was proposed to be a junior synonym of L. vulturinus because its differences in shape and size from the latter species were concluded to more likely represent intraspecific variation. Mayr and Kitchner (2025) disagreed with the proposed synonymy based on their notable size difference.

=== Lithornis plebius ===
L. plebius is from the same locality as L. promiscuus and was also described by Peter Houde (1988). The type specimen is USNM 336534.

=== Lithornis promiscuus ===
L. promiscuus has type specimen USNM 336535 and was described by Peter Houde (1988). It is from the Clark Quadrangle, Park County, Wyoming, USA. It is from the Willwood Formation, which is earliest Eocene in age. An egg, USNM 336570, is known for L. celetius as well.

=== Lithornis vulturinus ===
L. vulturinus was described as having vulture-like bones by Richard Owen in 1840 from the holotype fossil 955 738 - TM 024 717. The fossilized bones include an almost complete sternum and parts of the coracoid, a dorsal vertebra, a left femur and tibia and rib fragments. They were collected from Early Eocene London Clay deposits on the Isle of Sheppey, Kent, England and held in the collections of John Hunter and a Mr Bowerbank. The collection date of the fossils are uncertain, but as Hunter died in 1793, it can be presumed that it is before this data. This fossil was destroyed by bombing in World War II. Numerous isolated fossil bones of Lithornis vulturinus were incorrectly described anew, such as Parvigyps praecox and Promusophaga magnifica - the supposed earliest vulture and turaco, while others were referred to existing families of neognathous birds. A neotype (BMNH A 5204) was erected to replace the holotype in 1988 by Houde, who for the first time diagnosed it as a paleognath based on complete three-dimensional skulls and skeletons of congeners from North America. An exceptionally preserved specimen was collected from Denmark and cataloged as MGUH 26770.

== Palaeobiology ==
Lithornis' wing bones are similar to those of storks and vultures, meaning that unlike modern tinamous it was capable of soaring flight.

In a study about ratite endocasts, Lithornis ranks among the taxa with well developed olfactory lobes. This is consistent with a nocturnal, forest-dwelling lifestyle, though as much all volant birds it retains large optical lobes.

Unlike modern tinamous, Lithornis has toe claws and reversed halluxes that allow for efficient perching.

Several egg fossils have been attributed to Lithornis. Their eggshells are, perhaps unsurprisingly, noted as being "ratite-like".
