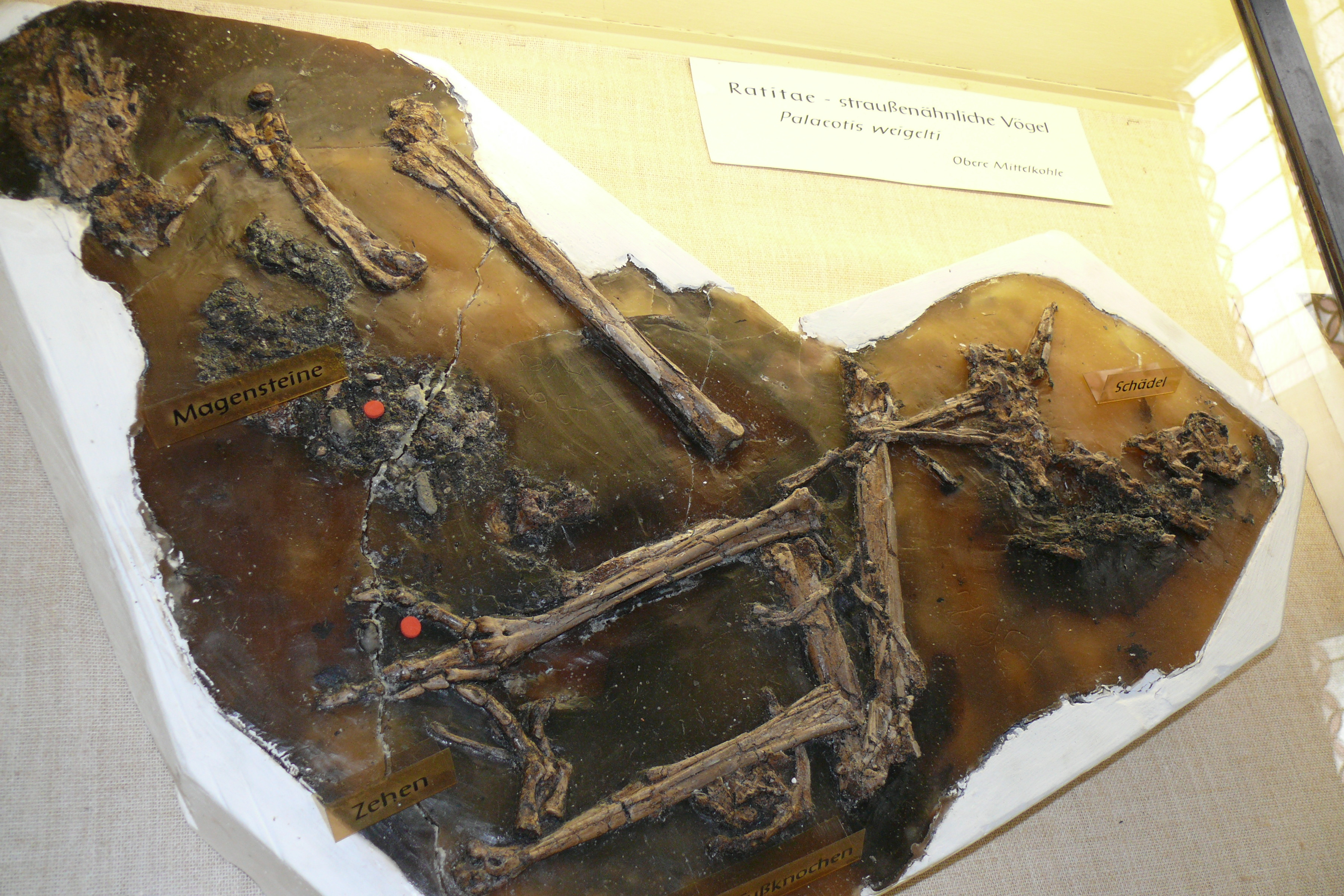
- Partial fossil specimen, Geisel valley museum

Scientific classification
- Kingdom: Animalia
- Phylum: Chordata
- Class: Aves
- Infraclass: Palaeognathae
- Order: Struthioniformes
- Family: †Palaeotidae
- Genus: †Palaeotis; Lambrecht, 1928

Type species
- †Palaeotis weigelti Lambrecht, 1928

Synonyms
- Palaeogrus geiseltalensis Lambrecht 1935; Ornitocnemus geiseltalensis (Lambrecht 1935) Brodkorb 1967

= Palaeotis =

Palaeotis Temporal range: Eocene, 40 Ma

Extinct genus of birds

Palaeotis is a genus of paleognath birds from the middle Eocene epoch of central Europe. One species is known, Palaeotis weigelti. The holotype specimen is a fossil tarsometatarsus and phalanx. Lambrect (1928) described it as an extinct bustard (genus Otis), and gave it its consequent name (Palaeotis means ancient bustard). After a suggestion by Storrs L. Olson, a review of the type specimen and the referral of several other fossils by Houde and Haubold (1987) concluded that Palaeotis is a palaeognath and assigned it to the same order as ostriches; the Struthioniformes. In 2021, it was considered a member of the family Paleotididae alongside Galligeranoides from the Early Eocene of France, which were found to be basal members of the Struthioniformes.

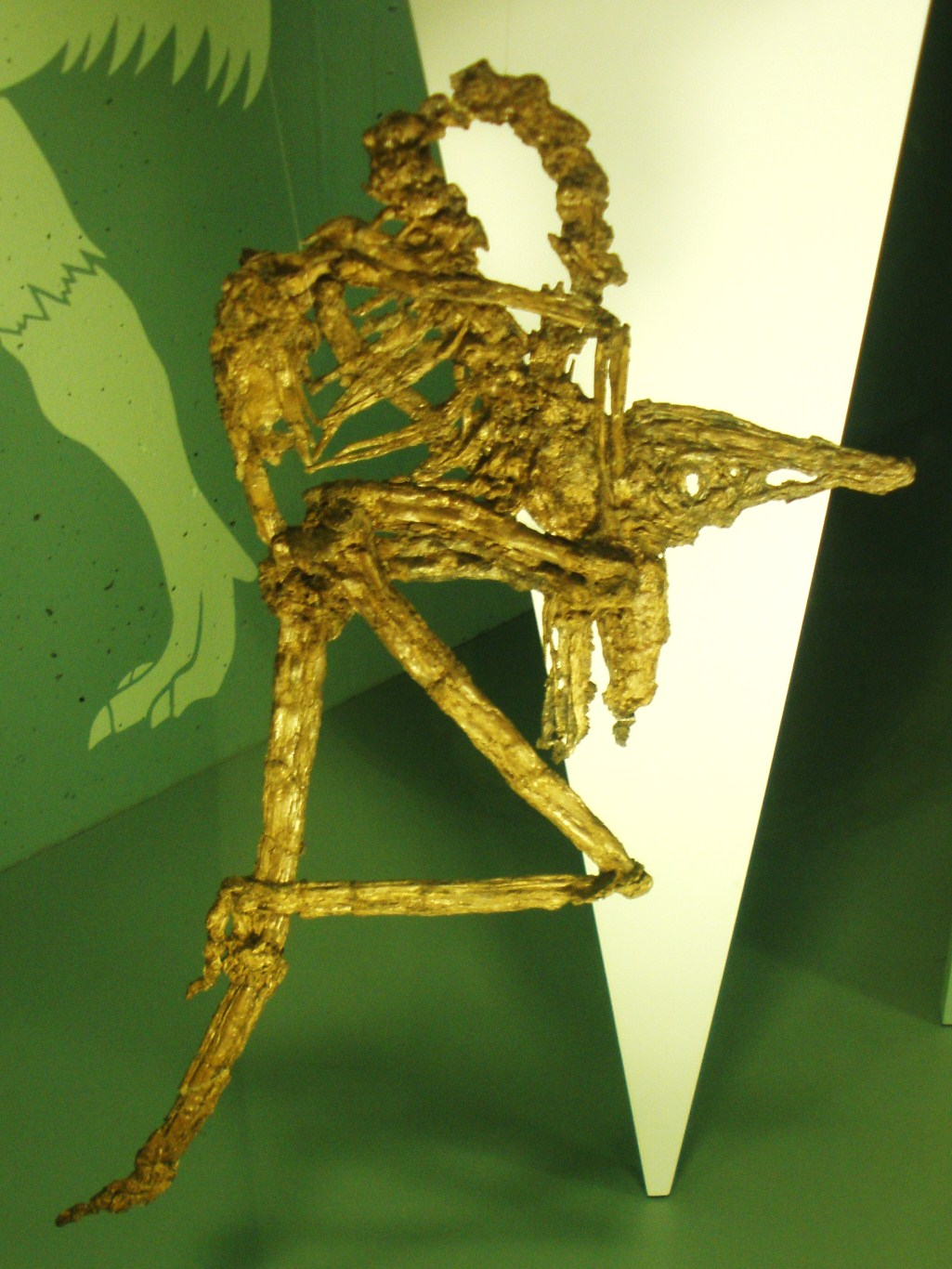
Fossil

In the 1930s a nearly complete fossil with catalog number GM 4362 was assigned to Palaeotis, probably by Lambrecht. Houde and Haubold found three additional specimens in the collection of the Geiseltalmuseum, Martin-Luther University, Halle/S., Germany. One of those three is the holotype specimen of Paleogrus geiseltalensis (=Ornithocnemus geiseltalensis, Lambrecht 1935). Houde and Haubold also requested permission to prepare a fossil cataloged as HLMD Me 7530 at the Hesseches Landesmuseum in Darmstadt, Germany. HLMD Me 7530 was collected from the famous Messel shales. When it was prepared, the two ornithologists assigned it to Palaeotis as well.

Other scientists are less convinced that Palaeotis is a struthioniform, placing it instead as a more basal ratite. It may be related to the mysterious Remiornis, a putative ratite known from the Eocene of France. Various other ratite remains also occur in the European Paleogene and early Miocene, and these may represent various independent lineages, leading to further confusion.

P. weigelti was slightly under 1 meter tall.

== Biology ==
Palaeotis is suggested to be sexually dimorphic, as some specimens being consistently smaller than others. While the forelimb is incomplete, the spindley humerus indicates that it had relatively large wings unlike modern ostriches and rheas. The beak was slender, more similar to that of lithornithids, and probably had similar carnivorous habits. Paleotis is considered to be flightless.
