= Palaeophasianus =

Palaeophasianus Temporal range: Early Eocene

Scientific classification
- Kingdom: Animalia
- Phylum: Chordata
- Class: Aves
- Infraclass: Palaeognathae
- Family: †Geranoididae
- Genus: †Palaeophasianus; Shufeldt, 1913
- Species: †P. meleagroides

Binomial name
- †Palaeophasianus meleagroides Shufeldt, 1913

Synonyms
- ?Geranoides

Extinct genus of birds

Palaeophasianus is an extinct genus of flightless Geranoididae birds that lived in North America during the Eocene period. Robert Wilson Shufeldt classified Palaeophasianus as a galliform when he described it in 1913. However it was transferred to Cracidae in 1964 by Pierce Brodkorb, while Joel Cracraft in 1968 placed it in Gruiformes.

The only species in this genus is P. meleagroides, and it is described as a "ground-dwelling carnivore". The fossil remains were found by the American Museum expedition of 1910 in Big Horn County, Wyoming, in the Willwood formation (early Eocene).
