= Galligeranoides =

Galligeranoides Temporal range: Ypresian

Scientific classification
- Kingdom: Animalia
- Phylum: Chordata
- Class: Aves
- Infraclass: Palaeognathae
- Family: †Geranoididae
- Genus: †Galligeranoides
- Species: †G. boriensis

Binomial name
- †Galligeranoides boriensis Bourdon et al., 2016

Extinct genus of birds

Galligeranoides is an extinct genus of geranoidid that lived during the Ypresian.

== Distribution ==
Galligeranoides boriensis is known from the site of La Borie in France.
