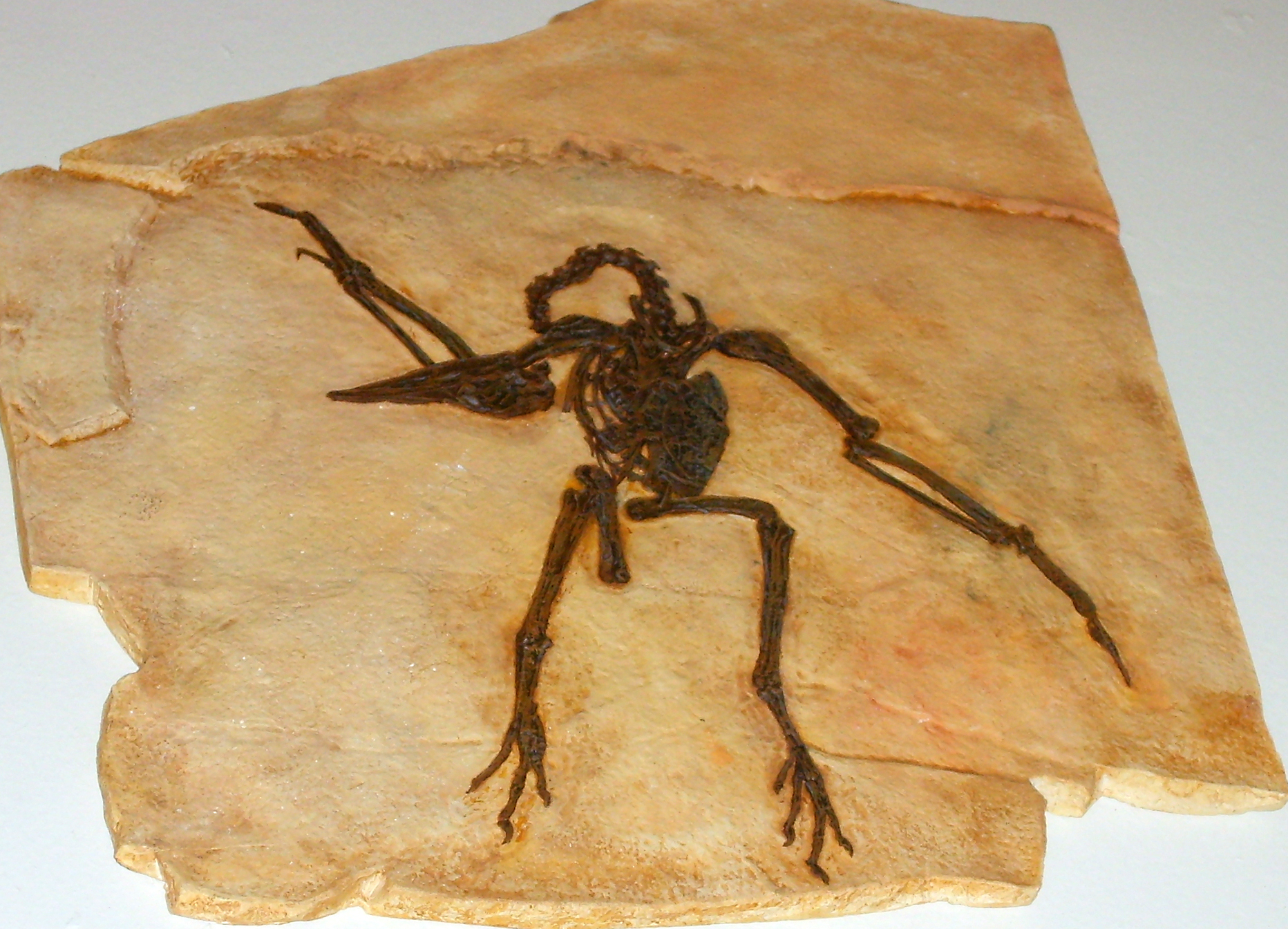
- Pseudocrypturus cercanaxius fossil cast, Zoologisk Museum, Copenhagen

Scientific classification
- Kingdom: Animalia
- Phylum: Chordata
- Class: Aves
- Infraclass: Palaeognathae
- Order: †Lithornithiformes; Houde, 1988
- Family: †Lithornithidae; Houde, 1988

Genera
- †Calciavis Nesbitt, 2016; †Fissuravis Mayr, 2007; †Paracathartes Harrison, 1979; †Pseudocrypturus Houde, 1988; †Lithornis Owen, 1840

= Lithornithidae =

Lithornithidae Temporal range: Paleocene-Eocene, 62–40 Ma Possible Cretaceous record

Extinct family of birds

Lithornithidae is an extinct, possibly paraphyletic (but see below) group of early paleognath birds. They are known from fossils dating to the Upper Paleocene through the Middle Eocene of North America and Europe, with possible Late Cretaceous representatives. All are extinct today; the youngest specimen is the currently unnamed SGPIMH MEV1 specimen from the mid-Eocene Messel Pit site.

Lithornithids had long, slender, bills for probing. They closely resembled modern tinamous, aside from more developed wings. They possessed a rhynchokinetic skull with relatively unfused cranial bones, a weakly fused pygostyle and a splenial. The unguals were more curved than in tinamous and probably allowed better perching in trees.

The order Lithornithiformes was erected by Dr. Peter Houde in 1988. Initially, only three genera (Lithornis, Paracathartes, and Pseudocrypturus) and eight named species were included. Promusophaga (Harrison & Walker, 1977) originally considered a stem-turaco, is considered synonymous with Lithornis vulturinus. Fissuravis may also belong to the clade, and several unnamed remains are known.

== Taxonomy ==
Lithornithiformes Houde, 1988

- †Lithornithidae Houde, 1988 (False tinamous)
  - †Calciavis grandei Nesbitt, 2016
  - †Fissuravis weigelti Mayr, 2007
  - †Paracathartes howardae Harrison, 1979 (Early Eocene of WC US)
  - †Pseudocrypturus cercanaxius Houde, 1988
  - †Lithornis Owen, 1840 [Promusophaga Harrison & Walker, 1977; Pediorallus Harrison, 1984; Parvigyps Harrison & Walker, 1977] (Paleocene – Early Eocene)
    - †L. celetius Houde, 1988
    - †L. plebius Houde, 1988
    - †L. promiscuus Houde, 1988
    - †L. nasi (Harrison, 1984) Houde, 1988 [Pediorallus nasi Harrison, 1984]
    - †L. hookeri (Harrison, 1984) Houde, 1988 [Pediorallus hookeri Harrison, 1984]
    - †L. vulturinus Owen, 1840 [Parvigyps praecox Harrison & Walker, 1977; Promusophaga magnifica Harrison & Walker, 1977; Pediorallus barbarae Harrison & Walker, 1977a] (London Clay Early Eocene of England)

Several studies have shown conflicting status on the monophyly of the group. Some studies recover them as a paraphyletic assemblage leading to modern paleognaths, but more recent examinations group them in a single, natural group basal to the rest of Palaeognathae. Of issue is Paracathartes, which differs radically from other lithornithids and has been suggested to be more closely related to extant paleognaths, though it is recently recovered as a derived lithornithid. (Note: This particular study defaults to the traditional paleognath classification scheme, based on the similarities with tinamous. The more recent genetic revaluations are vindicated, however, in that it recognises that the features uniting lithornithids to tinamous in the study are most likely basal to paleognaths as a whole.)

Lithornis itself may be paraphyletic in relation to Paracathartes and Pseudocrypturus.

== Paleobiology ==
In a study about ratite endocasts, Lithornis ranks among the taxa with well developed olfactory lobes. This is consistent with a nocturnal, forest-dwelling lifestyle, though as much all volant birds it retains large optical lobes.

Unlike modern tinamous, at least Lithornis has toe claws and reversed halluxes that allow for efficient perching. Also unlike modern tinamous most lithornithids were capable flyers, with their wings and sterna comparable to those of storks and vultures some even able to perform long distance migrations. The exception is Paracathartes which was similar to modern tinamous and fowl in its sternum and wing proportions and likely was a burst flyer as well.

Several egg fossils have been attributed to lithornithid birds. Both Lithornis and Paracathartes have entire nests assigned to them. Their eggshells are, perhaps unsurprisingly, noted as being "ratite-like".

Studies on lithornithid feathers shows that some species had gloss similar to that of cassowaries.

Lithornithids, much like modern paleognaths, ibises and shorebirds, had a vibrotactile bill tip organ, suggesting the development of this feature in the Cretaceous.
