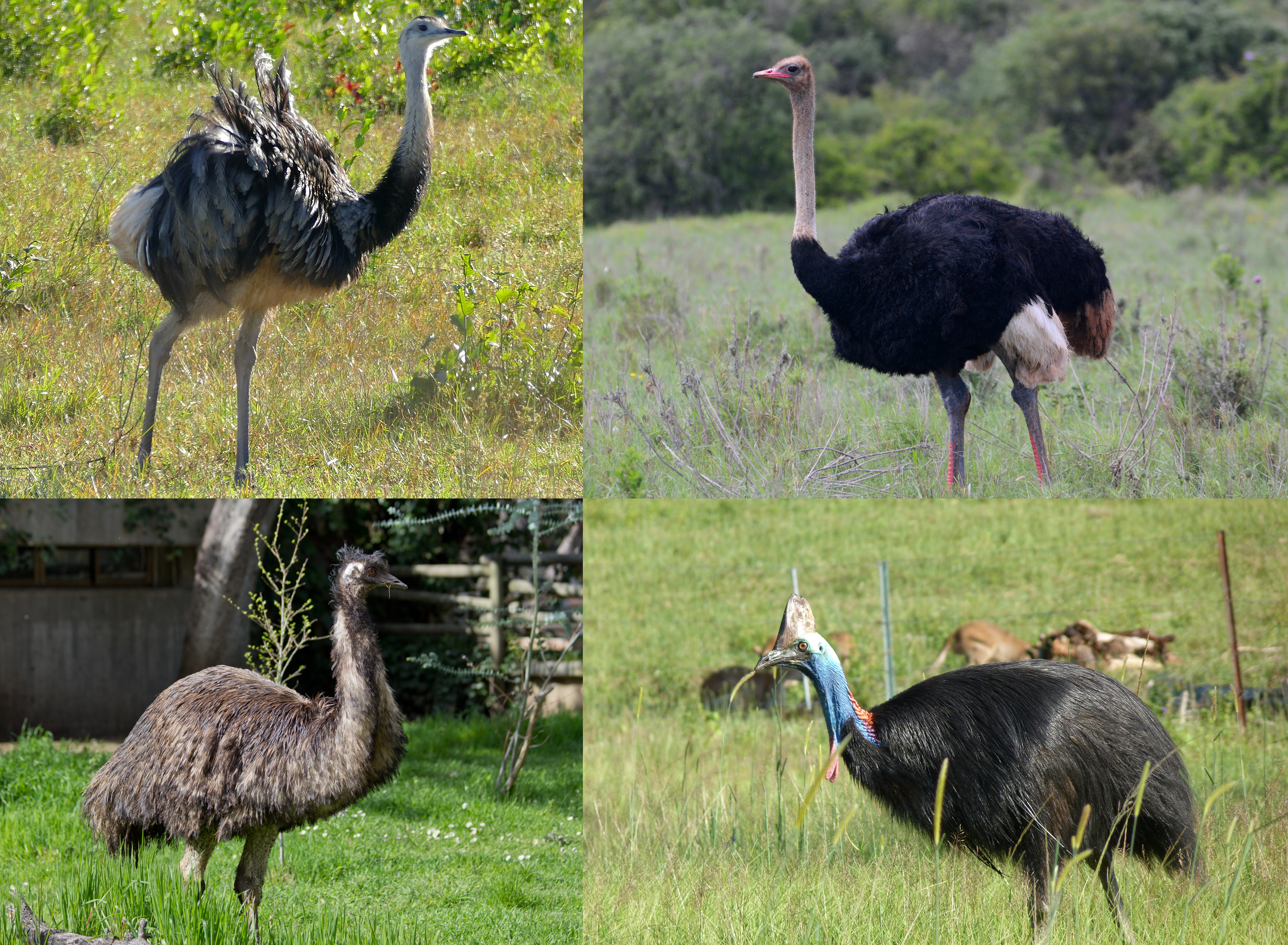
- Members of the four genera of large extant ratites. Clockwise from top left: Greater rhea, Common ostrich, Southern cassowary and Emu

Scientific classification
- Kingdom: Animalia
- Phylum: Chordata
- Class: Aves
- Infraclass: Palaeognathae

Groups included
- Struthioniformes (ostriches); Rheiformes (rheas); Casuariiformes (cassowaries and emus); †Aepyornithiformes (elephant birds); †Dinornithiformes (moa); Apterygiformes (kiwi)

Cladistically included but traditionally excluded taxa
- Tinamiformes; †Lithornithiformes?

Synonyms
- Grallae Linnaeus, 1760; Nudipedes Schäffer, 1774; Fissipedes bidactyles Schäffer, 1774; Retipedes Scopoli, 1777; Struthiones Latham, 1790; Campestres Illiger, 1811; Cursores Illiger, 1811; Proceri Illiger, 1811; Megistanes Vieillot, 1816; Brevipennes Cuvier, 1817; Pressirostres Cuvier, 1817; Inertes Temminck, 1820; Ratitae Ranzani, 1823; Rasores Vigors, 1826; Cursitrices MacGillivray, 1840; Grallatores Keyserling & Bl., 1840; Proceres Sunder., 1872; Struthiornithiformes Latham, 1790

= Ratite =

Ratites Temporal range: Paleocene–Holocene 56–0 Ma Possible Late Cretaceous record

Polyphyletic group of birds

Ratites (/ˈrætaɪts/) are a polyphyletic group consisting of all birds within the infraclass Palaeognathae that lack keels and cannot fly. They are mostly large, long-necked, and long-legged, the exception being kiwi, which are the only nocturnal extant ratites.

The understanding of relationships within the paleognath clade has been in flux. Previously, all the flightless members had been assigned to the order Struthioniformes, which is more recently regarded as containing only the ostrich. The modern bird infraclass Palaeognathae consists of ratites and the flighted Neotropic tinamous (compare to Neognathae). Unlike other flightless birds, the ratites have no keel on their sternum—hence the name, from the Latin ratis ('raft', a vessel which has no keel—in contradistinction to extant flighted birds with a keel). Without this to anchor their wing muscles, they could not have flown even if they had developed suitable wings. Ratites are a polyphyletic group; tinamous fall within them, and are the sister group of the extinct moa. This implies that flightlessness is a trait that evolved independently multiple times in different ratite lineages.

Most parts of the former supercontinent Gondwana have ratites, or did have until the fairly recent past. So did Europe in the Paleocene and Eocene, from where the first flightless paleognaths are known. Ostriches were present in Asia as recently as the Holocene, although the genus is thought to have originated in Africa. However, the ostrich order may have evolved in Eurasia. A recent study posits a Laurasian origin for the clade. Geranoidids, which may have been ratites, existed in North America.

== Species ==
=== Living forms ===
The African ostriches are the largest living ratites. A large member of these species can be nearly 2.8 metres (9 ft 2 in) tall, weigh as much as 156 kilograms (344 lb), and can outrun a horse.

Of the living species, the Australian emu is next in height, reaching up to 1.9 metres (6 ft 3 in) tall and about 50 kilograms (110 lb). Like the ostriches, it is a fast-running, powerful bird of the open plains and woodlands.

Also native to Australia and the islands to the north are the three species of cassowary. Shorter than an emu, but heavier and solidly built, cassowaries prefer thickly vegetated tropical forest. They can be dangerous when surprised or cornered because of their razor-sharp talons. In New Guinea, cassowary eggs are brought back to villages and the chicks raised for eating as a much-prized delicacy, despite (or perhaps because of) the risk they pose to life and limb. They reach up to 1.8 metres (5 ft 11 in) tall and weigh as much as 85 kilograms (187 lb).

South America has two species of rhea, large fast-running birds of the Pampas. The larger American rhea grows to about 1.4 metres (4 ft 7 in) tall and usually weighs 15 to 40 kilograms (33–88 lb).

The smallest ratites are the five species of kiwi from New Zealand. Kiwi are chicken-sized, shy, and nocturnal. They nest in deep burrows and use a highly developed sense of smell to find small insects and grubs in the soil. Kiwi are notable for laying eggs that are very large in relation to their body size. A kiwi egg may equal 15 to 20 percent of the body mass of a female kiwi. The smallest species of kiwi is the little spotted kiwi, at 0.9 to 1.9 kilograms (2.0–4.2 lb) and 35 to 45 centimetres (14–18 in) tall.

=== Holocene extinct forms ===
At least nine species of moa lived in New Zealand before the arrival of humans, ranging from turkey-sized to the giant moa Dinornis robustus with a height of 3.7 metres (12 ft 2 in) and weighing about 230 kilograms (510 lb). They became extinct by A.D. 1400 due to hunting by Māori settlers, who arrived around A.D. 1280.

Aepyornis maximus, the "elephant bird" of Madagascar, was the heaviest bird ever known. Although shorter than the tallest moa, a large A. maximus could weigh over 400 kilograms (880 lb) and stand up to 3 metres (9 ft 10 in) tall. Accompanying it were three other species of Aepyornis as well as three species of the smaller genus Mullerornis. All these species went into decline following the arrival of humans on Madagascar around 2,000 years ago, and were extinct by the 17th or 18th century if not earlier.

== Classification ==
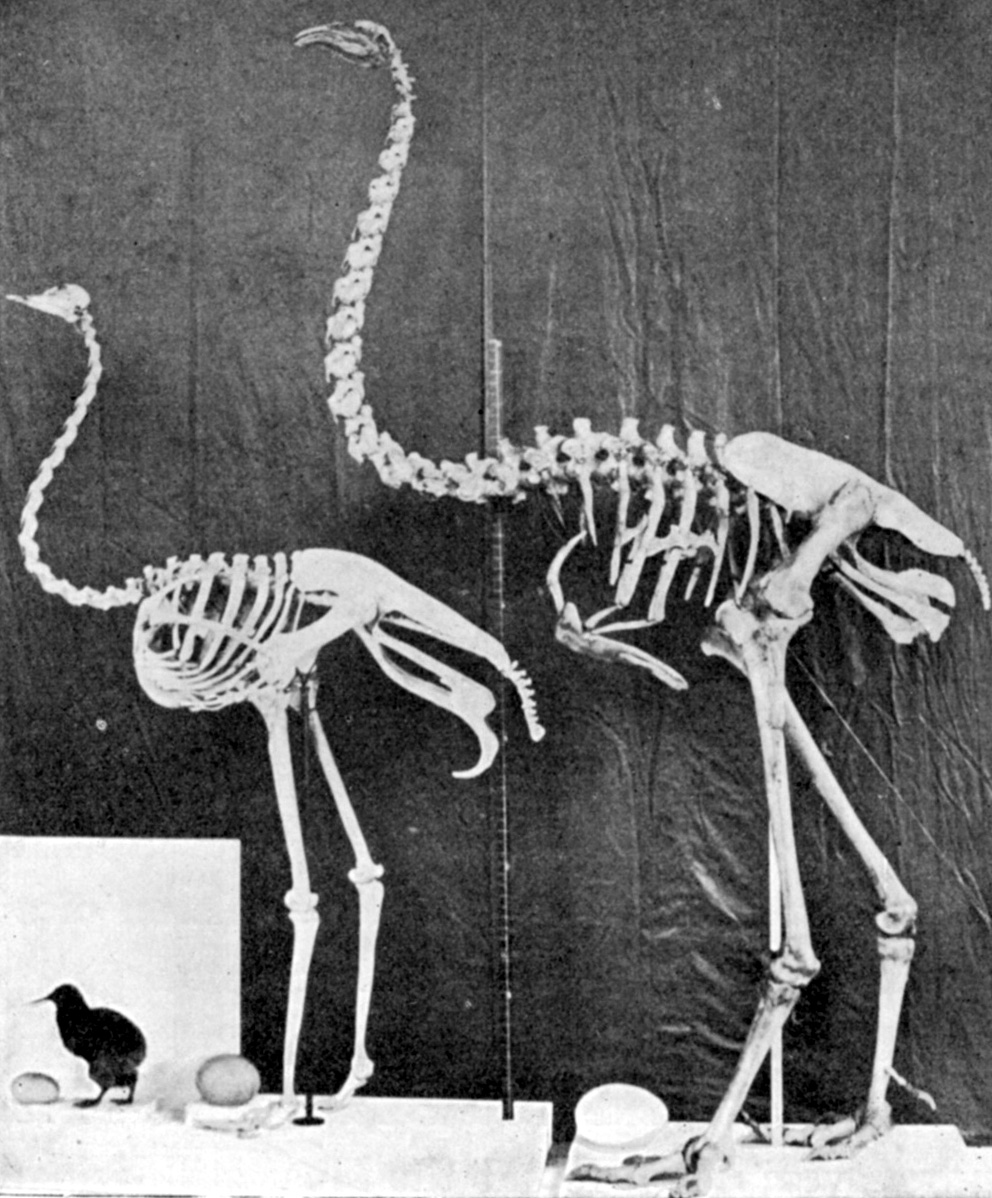
Comparison of a kiwi, ostrich, and Dinornis, each with its egg

There are two taxonomic approaches to ratite classification: one combines the groups as families in the order Struthioniformes, while the other supposes that the lineages evolved mostly independently and thus elevates the families to order rank (Rheiformes, Casuariformes etc.).

== Evolution ==
The longstanding story of ratite evolution was that they share a common flightless ancestor that lived in Gondwana, whose descendants were isolated from each other by continental drift, which carried them to their present locations. Supporting this idea, some studies based on morphology, immunology and DNA sequencing reported that ratites are monophyletic. Cracraft's 1974 biogeographic vicariance hypothesis suggested that ancestral flightless paleognaths, the ancestors of ratites, were present and widespread in Gondwana during the Late Cretaceous. As the supercontinent fragmented due to plate tectonics, they were carried by plate movements to their current positions and evolved into the species present today. The earliest known ratite fossils date to the Paleocene epoch about 56 million years ago (e.g., Diogenornis, a possible early relative of the rhea). However, more primitive paleognaths are known from several million years earlier, and the classification and membership of the Ratitae itself is uncertain. Some of the earliest ratites occur in Europe.

Recent analyses of genetic variation between the ratites do not support this simple picture. The ratites may have diverged from one another too recently to share a common Gondwanan ancestor. Also, the Middle Eocene ratites such as Palaeotis and Remiornis from Central Europe may imply that the "out-of-Gondwana" hypothesis is oversimplified.

Molecular phylogenies of the ratites have generally placed ostriches in the basal position and among extant ratites, placed rheas in the second most basal position, with Australo-Pacific ratites splitting up last; they have also shown that both the latter groups are monophyletic. Early mitochondrial genetic studies that failed to make ostriches basal were apparently compromised by the combination of rapid early radiation of the group and long terminal branches. A morphological analysis that created a basal New Zealand clade has not been corroborated by molecular studies. A 2008 study of nuclear genes shows ostriches branching first, followed by rheas and tinamous, then kiwi splitting from emus and cassowaries. In more recent studies, moas and tinamous were shown to be sister groups, and elephant birds were shown to be most closely related to the New Zealand kiwi. Additional support for the latter relationship was obtained from morphological analysis.

The finding that tinamous nest within this group, originally based on twenty nuclear genes and corroborated by a study using forty novel nuclear loci makes 'ratites' polyphyletic rather than monophyletic, if we exclude the tinamous. Since tinamous are weak fliers, this raises interesting questions about the evolution of flightlessness in this group. The branching of the tinamous within the ratite radiation suggests flightlessness evolved independently among ratites at least three times. More recent evidence suggests this happened at least six times, or once in each major ratite lineage. Re-evolution of flight in the tinamous would be an alternative explanation, but such a development is without precedent in avian history, while loss of flight is commonplace.

Cladogram based on Kück and Suh 2026

- Paleognathae
  - Struthionidae (ostriches)
  - Notopalaeognathae
    - Rheidae (rheas)
    - Dinocrypturi
      - Tinamidae (tinamou)
      - †Dinornithiformes (moa)
    - - Apterygidae (kiwis)
      - †Aepyornithiformes (elephant birds)
    - Casuariiformes
      - Casuarius (cassowary)
      - Dromaius (emu)

By 2014, a mitochondrial DNA phylogeny including fossil members placed ostriches on the basal branch, followed by rheas, then a clade consisting of moas and tinamous, followed by the final two branches: a clade of emus plus cassowaries and one of elephant birds plus kiwis.

Vicariant speciation based on the plate tectonic split-up of Gondwana followed by continental drift would predict that the deepest phylogenetic split would be between African and all other ratites, followed by a split between South American and Australo-Pacific ratites, roughly as observed. However, the elephant bird–kiwi relation appears to require dispersal across oceans by flight, as apparently does the colonization of New Zealand by the moa and possibly the back-dispersal of tinamous to South America, if the latter occurred. The phylogeny as a whole suggests not only multiple independent origins of flightlessness, but also of gigantism (at least five times). Gigantism in birds tends to be insular; however, a ten-million-year-long window of opportunity for evolution of avian gigantism on continents may have existed following the extinction of the non-avian dinosaurs, in which ratites were able to fill vacant herbivorous niches before mammals attained large size. Some authorities, though, have been skeptical of the new findings and conclusions.

Kiwi and tinamous are the only palaeognath lineages not to evolve gigantism, perhaps because of competitive exclusion by giant ratites already present on New Zealand and South America when they arrived or arose. The fact that New Zealand has been the only land mass to recently support two major lineages of flightless ratites may reflect the near total absence of native mammals, which allowed kiwi to occupy a mammal-like nocturnal niche. However, various other landmasses such as South America and Europe have supported multiple lineages of flightless ratites that evolved independently, undermining this competitive exclusion hypothesis.

Most recently, studies on genetic and morphological divergence and fossil distribution show that paleognaths as a whole probably had an origin in the northern hemisphere. Early Cenozoic northern hemisphere paleognaths such as Lithornis, Pseudocrypturus, Paracathartes and Palaeotis appear to be the most basal members of the clade. The various ratite lineages were probably descended from flying ancestors that independently colonised South America and Africa from the north, probably initially in South America. From South America, they could have traveled overland to Australia via Antarctica, (by the same route marsupials are thought to have used to reach Australia) and then reached New Zealand and Madagascar via "sweepstakes" dispersals (rare low probability dispersal methods, such as long distance rafting) across the oceans. Gigantism would have evolved subsequent to trans-oceanic dispersals.

=== Loss of flight ===
Loss of flight allows birds to eliminate the costs of maintaining various flight-enabling adaptations like high pectoral muscle mass, hollow bones and a light build, et cetera. The basal metabolic rate of flighted species is much higher than that of flightless terrestrial birds. But energetic efficiency can only help explain the loss of flight when the benefits of flying are not critical to survival.

Research on flightless rails indicates the flightless condition evolved in the absence of predators. This shows flight to be generally necessary for survival and dispersal in birds. In apparent contradiction to this, many landmasses occupied by ratites are also inhabited by predatory mammals. However, the K–Pg extinction event created a window of time with large predators absent that may have allowed the ancestors of extant flightless ratites to evolve flightlessness. They subsequently underwent selection for large size. One hypothesis suggests that as predation pressure decreases on islands with low raptor species richness and no mammalian predators, the need for large, powerful flight muscles that make for a quick escape decreases. Moreover, raptor species tend to become generalist predators on islands with low species richness, as opposed to specializing in the predation of birds. An increase in leg size compensates for a reduction in wing length in insular birds that have not lost flight by providing a longer lever to increase force generated during the thrust that initiates takeoff.

== Description ==
Ratites in general have many physical characteristics in common, although many are not shared by the family Tinamidae, or tinamous. First, the breast muscles are underdeveloped. They do not have keeled sterna. Their wishbones (furculae) are almost absent. They have simplified wing skeletons and musculature. Their legs are stronger and do not have air chambers, except the femurs. Their tail and flight feathers have retrogressed or have become decorative plumes. They have no feather vanes, which means they do not need to oil their feathers, hence they have no preen glands. They have no separation of pterylae (feathered areas) and apteria (non-feathered areas), and finally, they have palaeognathous palates.

Ostriches have the greatest dimorphism; rheas show some dichromatism during the breeding season. Emus, cassowaries, and kiwis show some dimorphism, predominantly in size.

While the ratites share a lot of similarities, they also have major differences. Ostriches have only two toes, with one being much larger than the other. Cassowaries have developed long inner toenails, used defensively. Ostriches and rheas have prominent wings; although they do not use them to fly, they do use them in courtship and predator distraction.

Without exception, ratite chicks are capable of swimming and even diving.

On an allometric basis, paleognaths have generally smaller brains than neognaths. Kiwis are exceptions to this trend, and possess proportionally larger brains comparable to those of parrots and songbirds, though evidence for similar advanced cognitive skills is currently lacking.

=== Gallery of living species ===
Ratites include one species of Emu, two species each of Ostrich and Rhea, three species of Cassowary and five species of Kiwi.

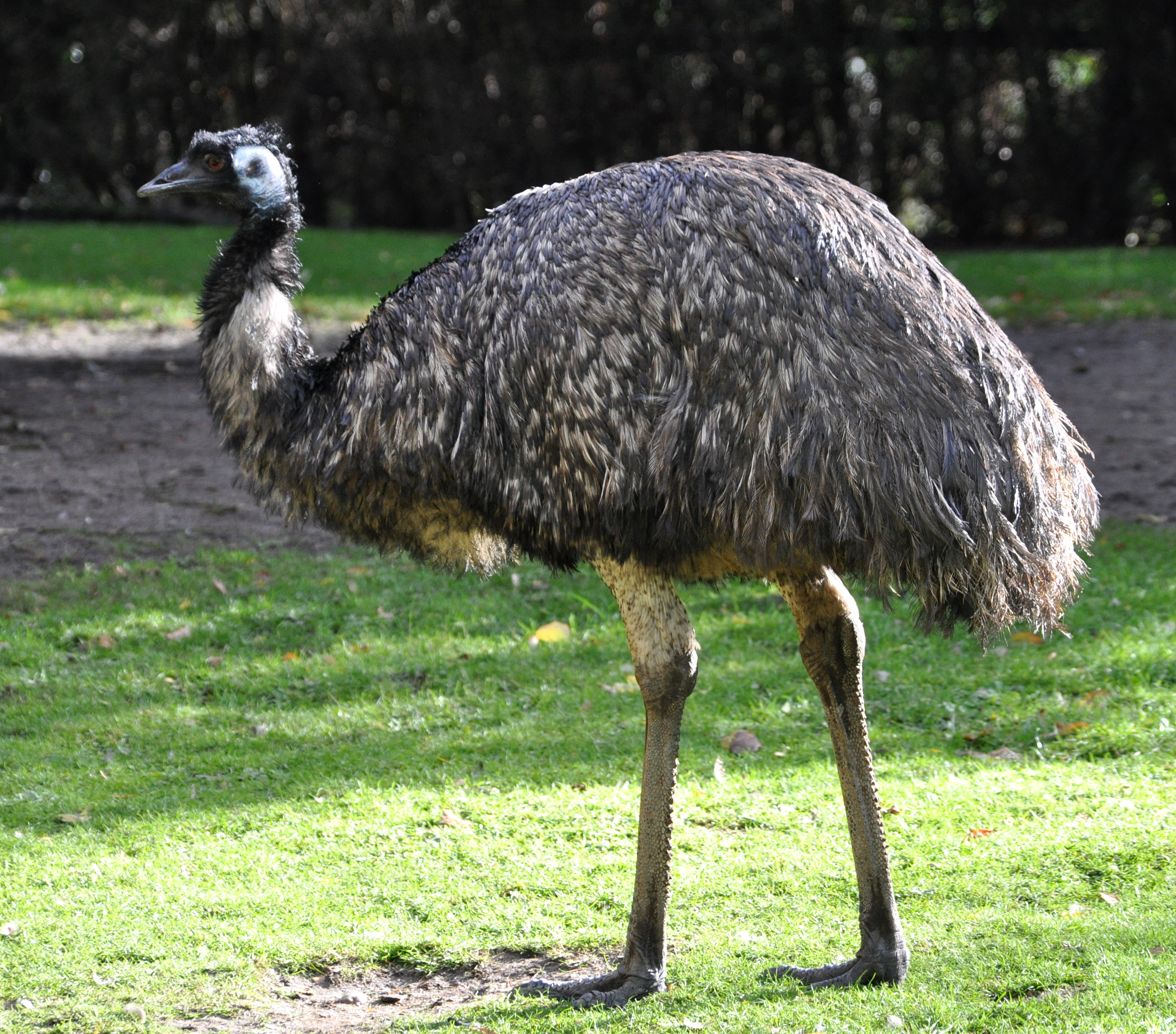
Emu

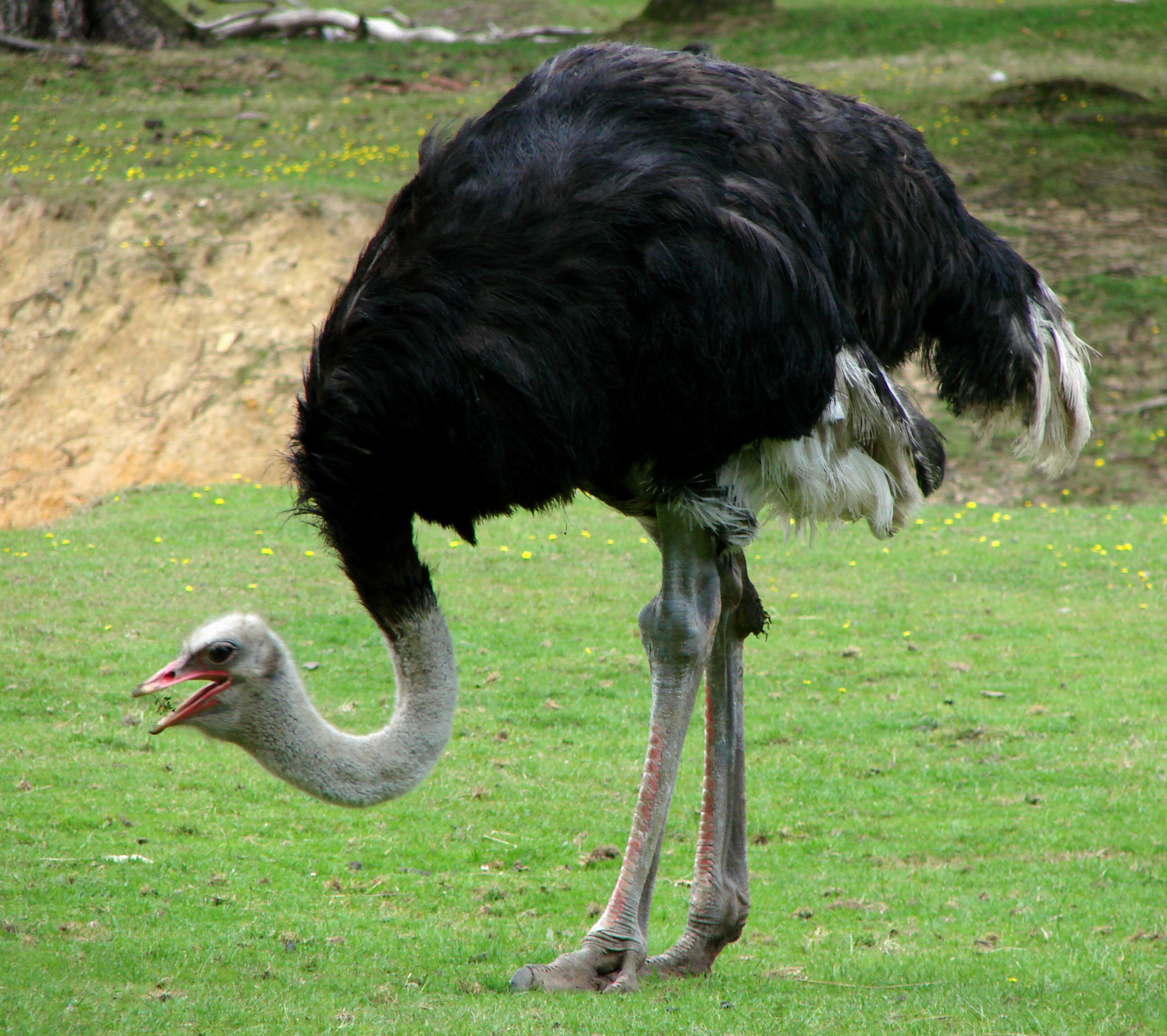
Common ostrich

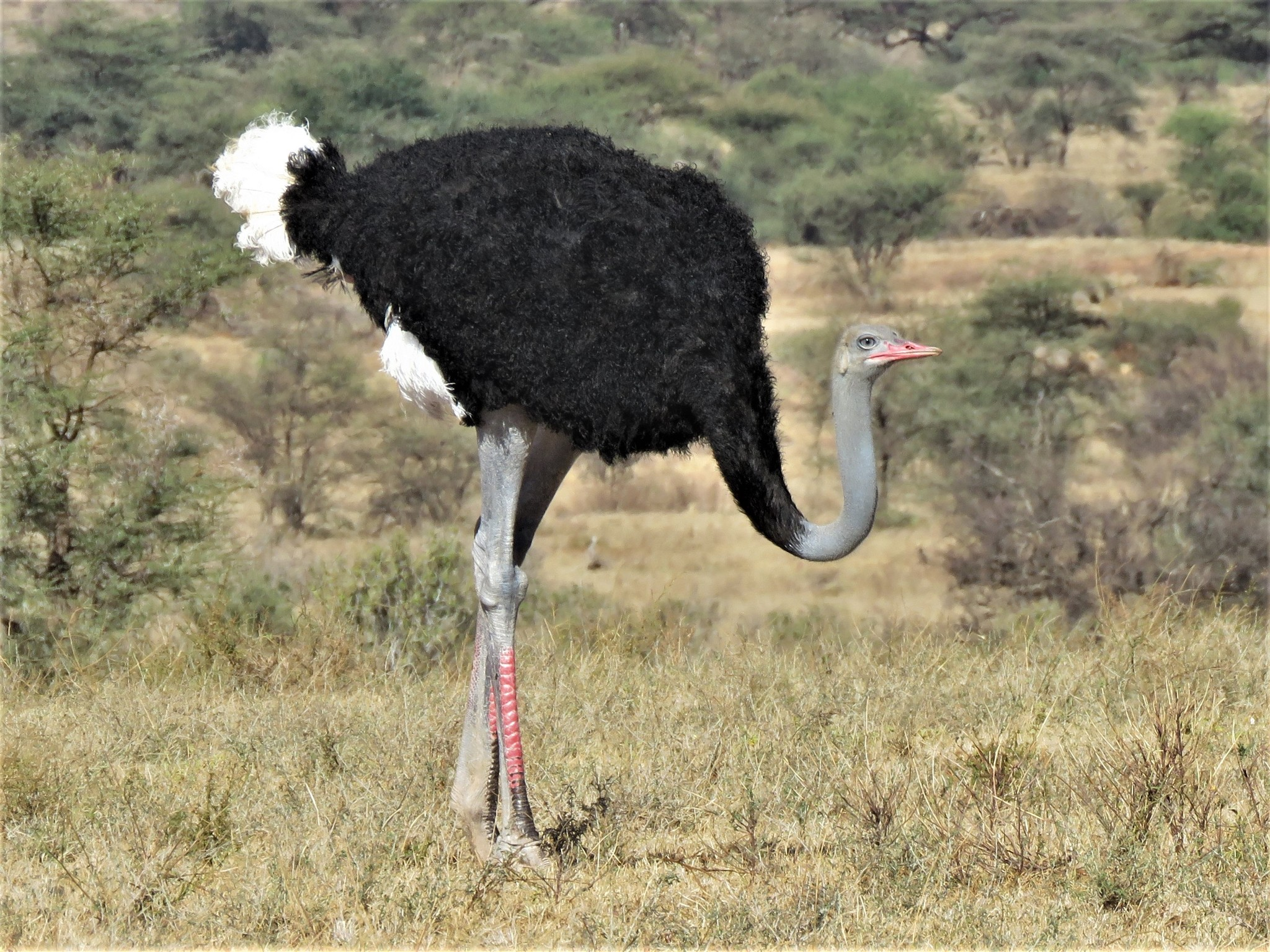
Somali ostrich

Darwin's rhea

Greater rhea

Great spotted kiwi

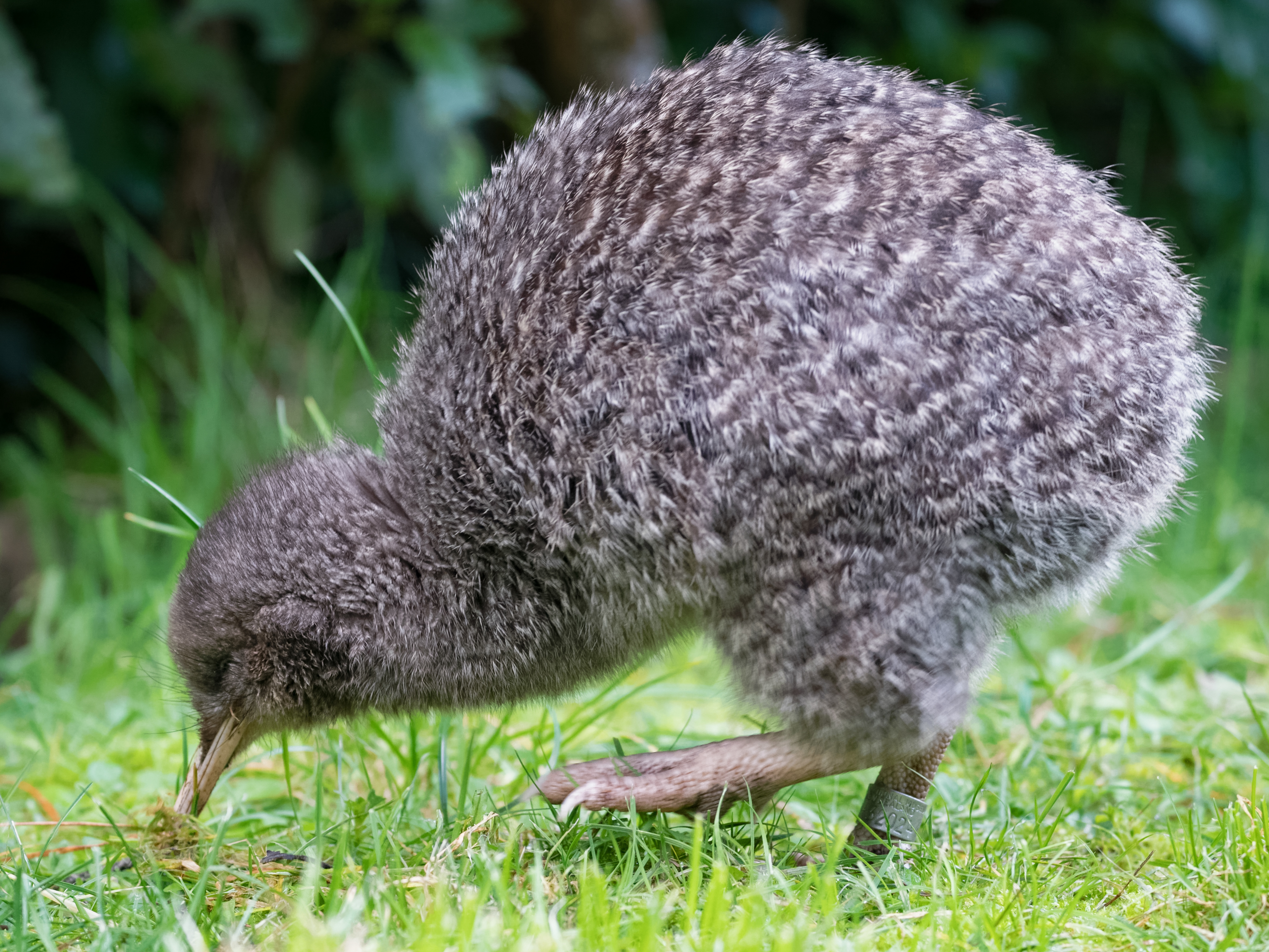
Little spotted kiwi

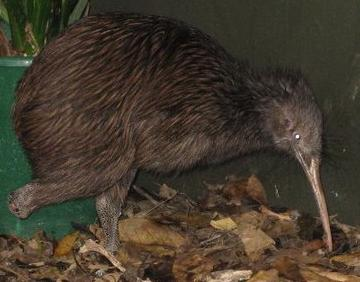
North Island brown kiwi

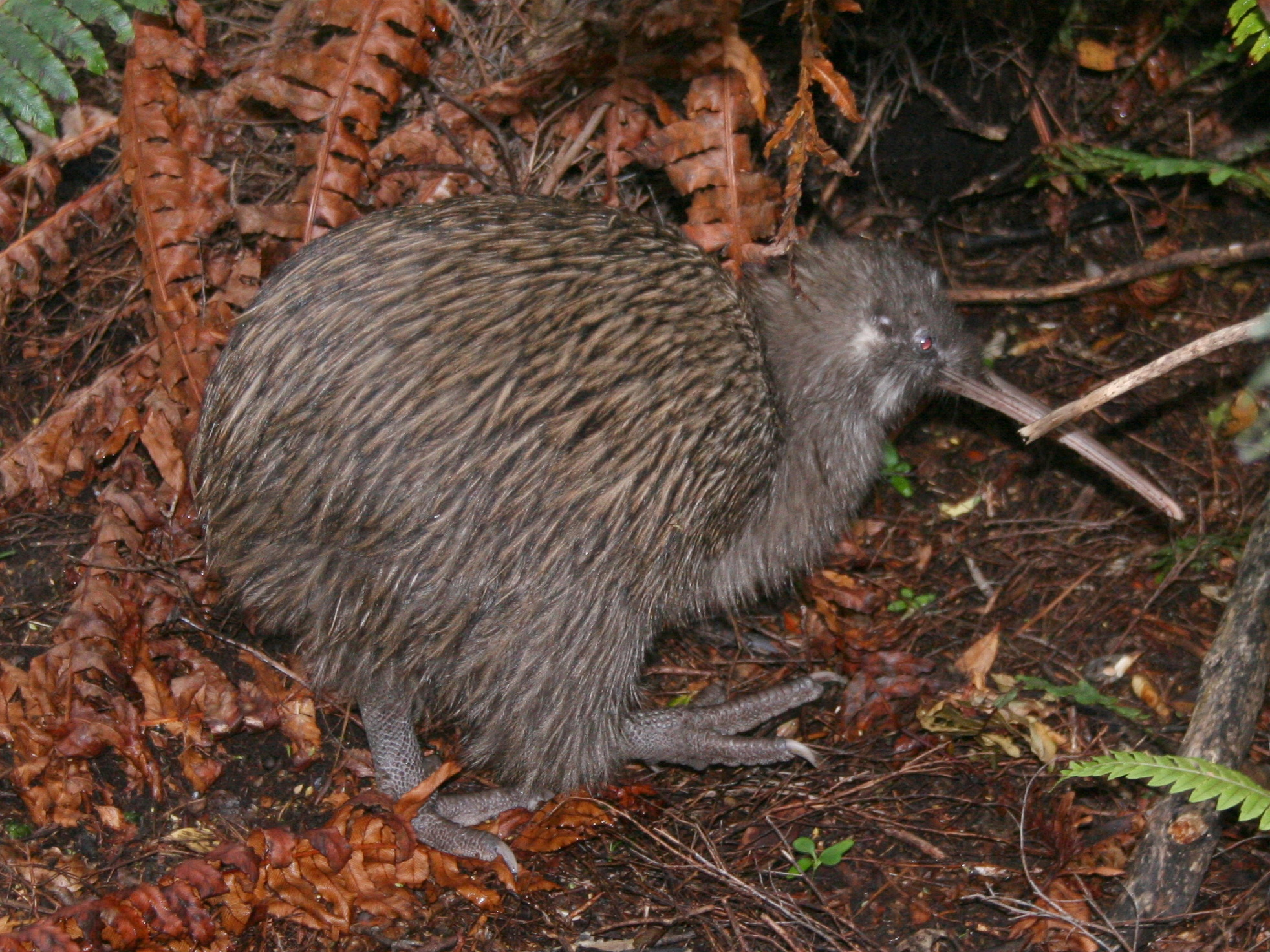
Southern brown kiwi

Okarito kiwi

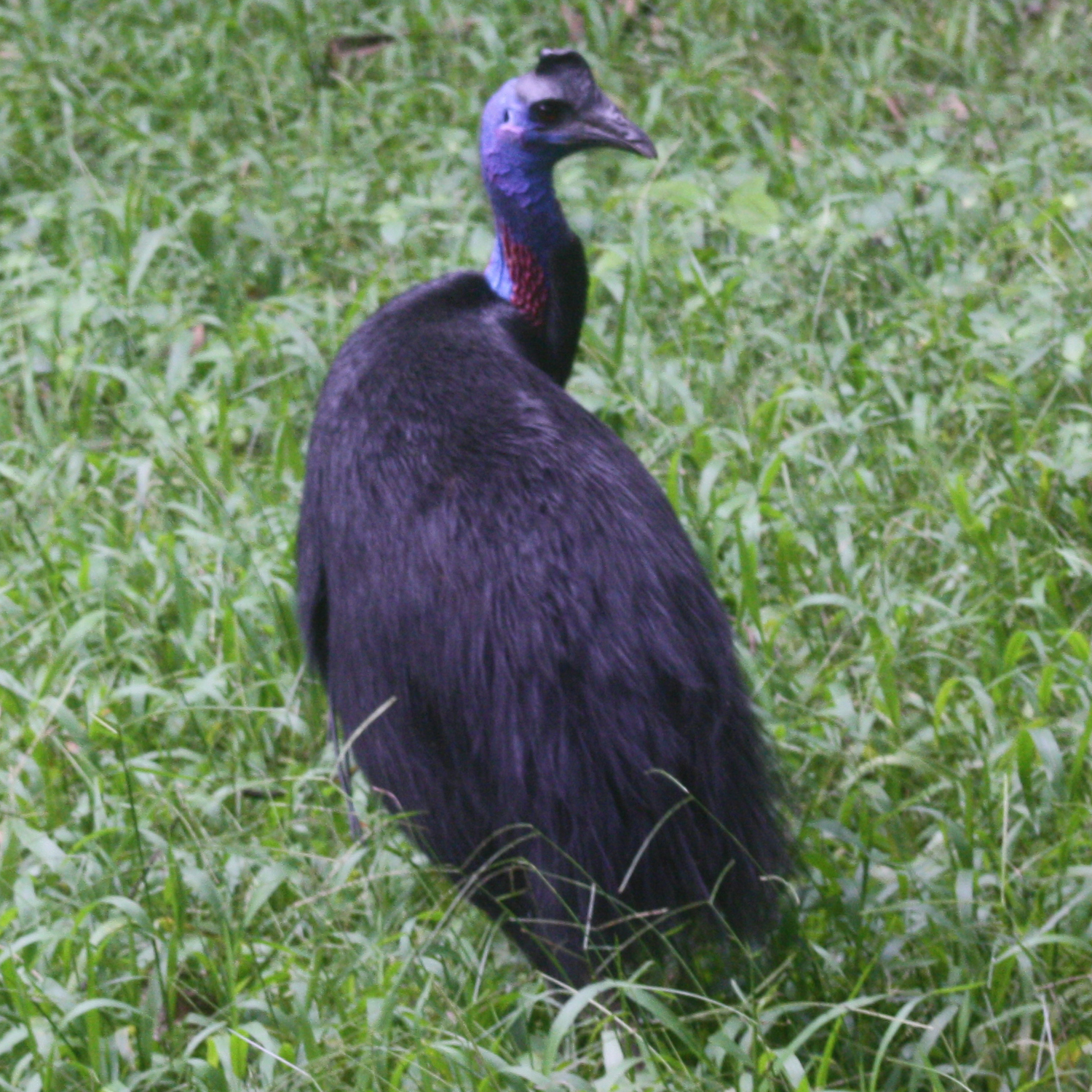
Dwarf cassowary

Northern cassowary

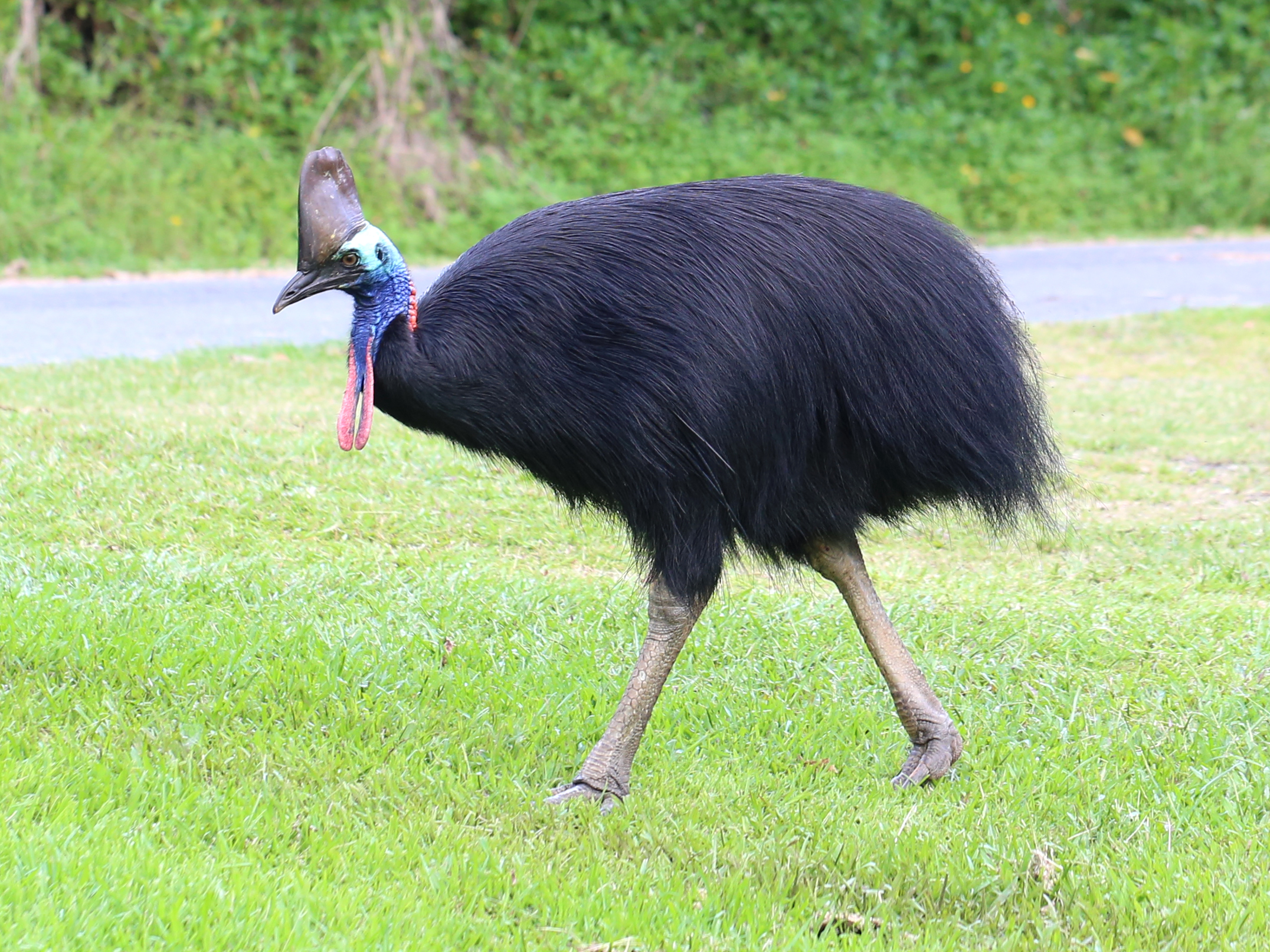
Southern cassowary

== Behavior and ecology ==
=== Feeding and diet ===
Ratite chicks tend to be more omnivorous or insectivorous; similarities in adults end with feeding, as they all vary in diet and length of digestive tract, which is indicative of diet. Ostriches, with the longest tracts at 14 m (46 ft), are primarily herbivorous. Rheas' tracts are next longest at 8–9 m (26–30 ft), and they also have caeca. They are also mainly herbivores, concentrating on broad-leafed plants. However, they will eat insects if the opportunity arises. Emus have tracts of 7 m (23 ft) length, and have a more omnivorous diet, including insects and other small animals. Cassowaries have next to the shortest tracts at 4 m (13 ft). Finally, kiwi have the shortest tracts and eat earthworms, insects, and other similar creatures. Moas and elephant birds were the largest native herbivores in their faunas, far larger than contemporary herbivorous mammals in the latter's case.

Some extinct ratites might have had odder lifestyles, such as the narrow-billed Diogenornis and Palaeotis, compared to the shorebird-like lithornithids, and could imply similar animalivorous diets.

=== Reproduction ===
Ratites are different from the flying birds in that they needed to adapt or evolve certain features to protect their young. First and foremost is the thickness of the shells of their eggs. Their young are hatched more developed than most and they can run or walk soon thereafter. Also, most ratites have communal nests, where they share the incubating duties with others. Ostriches and great spotted kiwis are the only ratites where the female incubates; they share the duties with the males incubating at night. Cassowaries and emu are polyandrous, with males incubating eggs and rearing chicks with no obvious contribution from females. Ostriches and rheas are polygynous with each male courting several females. Male rheas are responsible for building nests and incubating while ostrich males incubate only at night. Kiwis stand out as the exception with extended monogamous reproductive strategies where either the male alone or both sexes incubate a single egg. Unlike most birds, male ratites have a phallus that is inserted into the female's cloaca during copulation. The following table shows various morphologic and reproductive aspects of Ratites.

Morphologic and Reproductive Aspects of Ratites
Aspect/Bird	Ostrich	Emu	Rhea	Cassowary	Kiwi
Size (m)	2.5–3.0	1.5–1.8	1.5–1.7	1.7–2.0	0.3–0.6
Max. weight (kg)	120–160	38–55	25	60–85	1–4
Gender size	M > F	F > M	M > F	F > M	F > M
Breeding strategy	Polygamous	Paired for breeding	Polygamous	Paired for breeding	Paired for life
Eggs No/year	<100	7–20	10–15	3–6	1–3
Egg color	cream	dark green granular	yellow-greenish	light, bright green	white
Egg weight (kg/g)	1–2 kg	500–700 g	400–600 g	600–700 g	400–500 g
Incubation (days)	39–44	56–61	39–42	60	71–78 (–92)
Incubating partner	M (night), F (day)	M	M	M	M
Parental care	M (+F), 1 year	M	M, 4–6 months	M	M (+ F)
M : Male, F : Female

== Ratites and humans ==
Ratites and humans have had a long relationship starting with the use of the egg for water containers, jewelry, or other art medium. Male ostrich feathers were popular for hats during the 18th century, which led to hunting and sharp declines in populations. Ostrich farming grew out of this need, and humans harvested feathers, hides, eggs, and meat from the ostrich. Emu farming also became popular for similar reasons and for their emu oil. Rhea feathers are popular for dusters, and eggs and meat are used for chicken and pet feed in South America. Ratite hides are popular for leather products like shoes.

=== United States regulation ===
The USDA's Food Safety and Inspection Service (FSIS) began a voluntary, fee-for-service ratite inspection program in 1995 to help the fledgling industry improve the marketability of the meat. A provision in the FY2001 USDA appropriations act (P.L. 106–387) amended the Poultry Products Inspection Act to make federal inspection of ratite meat mandatory as of April 2001 (21 U.S.C. 451 et seq.).

== See also ==
- List of Struthioniformes by population
