= Remiornis =

Remiornis Temporal range: Paleocene 58–55 Ma

Scientific classification
- Kingdom: Animalia
- Phylum: Chordata
- Class: Aves
- Infraclass: Palaeognathae
- Family: †Remiornithidae; Martin, 1992
- Genus: †Remiornis; Lemoine, 1881
- Species: †R. heberti

Binomial name
- †Remiornis heberti Lemoine, 1881

Extinct genus of birds

Remiornis heberti is an extinct species of paleognath bird from the Paleocene of France. It is a species comparable in size to modern rheas, and possibly related to another European Paleogene ratite, Palaeotis. In spite of being one of the oldest ratites in the world, it is often ignored for Gondwana vicariance narratives.
