= Paracathartes =

Paracathartes Temporal range: Early Paleocene–Middle Eocene

Scientific classification
- Kingdom: Animalia
- Phylum: Chordata
- Class: Aves
- Infraclass: Palaeognathae
- Order: †Lithornithiformes
- Family: †Lithornithidae
- Genus: †Paracathartes; Harrison, 1979
- Species: †P. howardae

Binomial name
- †Paracathartes howardae Harrison, 1979

Extinct genus of birds

Paracathartes is a genus of extinct bird from the Wasachtian horizon of lower Eocene Wyoming. One species, Paracathartes howardae has been described.

It is a paleognathous bird, turkey-like in stature and size, that probably resembled a tinamou quite closely. Unlike other lithornithids but much like its modern relatives it was probably a poor flyer.

Paracathartes was described by Harrison as the earliest known cathartid vulture. Rich criticized this assignment. Houde (1988) included it as a member of the order Lithornithiformes and family Lithornithidae.

The holotype specimen is in the collection of the Royal Ontario Museum. It has catalog number ROM 22658. It is the distal end of a left tibiotarsus. It was collected by G. E. Lindblad and G. Sternberg on 4 August 1949. It was found at the northernmost branch of Elk Creek, near Basin, Wyoming. The horizon is Greybullian, middle Wasatchian (early Eocene), Willwood Formation, Bighorn Basin.

Further specimens of Paracathartes were collected, including almost the whole skeleton (USNM 361402-361446, 391984, 404747-404806) from at least five individuals preserved together. These bones were associated with three whole eggs (USNM 336564) and an avian neurocranium (USNM 361415) which may belong to Paracathartes or to a possible phorusrhacid.
