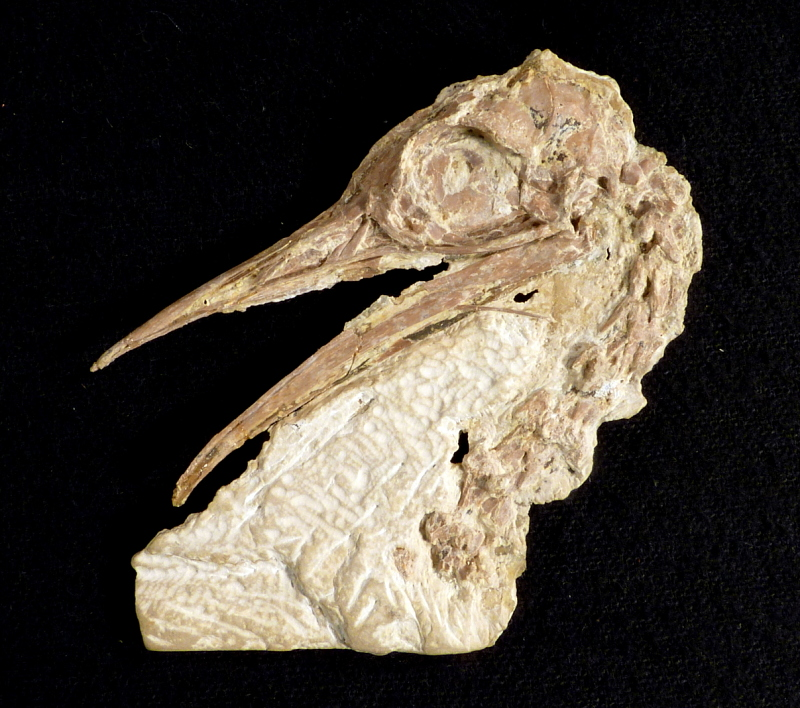
- Head and neck of the holotype specimen in the Smithsonian Institution

Scientific classification
- Kingdom: Animalia
- Phylum: Chordata
- Class: Aves
- Infraclass: Palaeognathae
- Order: †Lithornithiformes
- Family: †Lithornithidae
- Genus: †Pseudocrypturus; Houde, 1988

Type species
- †Pseudocrypturus cercanaxius Houde, 1988

Other species
- †?P. danielsi Mayr & Kitchener, 2025; †?P. gracilipes Mayr & Kitchener, 2025

= Pseudocrypturus =

Pseudocrypturus Temporal range: 55.8–50.3 Ma Early Eocene

Extinct genus of birds

Pseudocrypturus is a genus of extinct paleognathous bird. Three species are known and the type species is Pseudocrypturus cercanaxius. It is a relative of such modern birds as ostriches. It lived in the early Eocene. The holotype fossil is in the collection of the Smithsonian's National Museum of Natural History. It has catalog number USNM 336103. It was collected from the Fossil Butte Member, Green River Formation, Lincoln County, Wyoming.

== Taxonomy ==
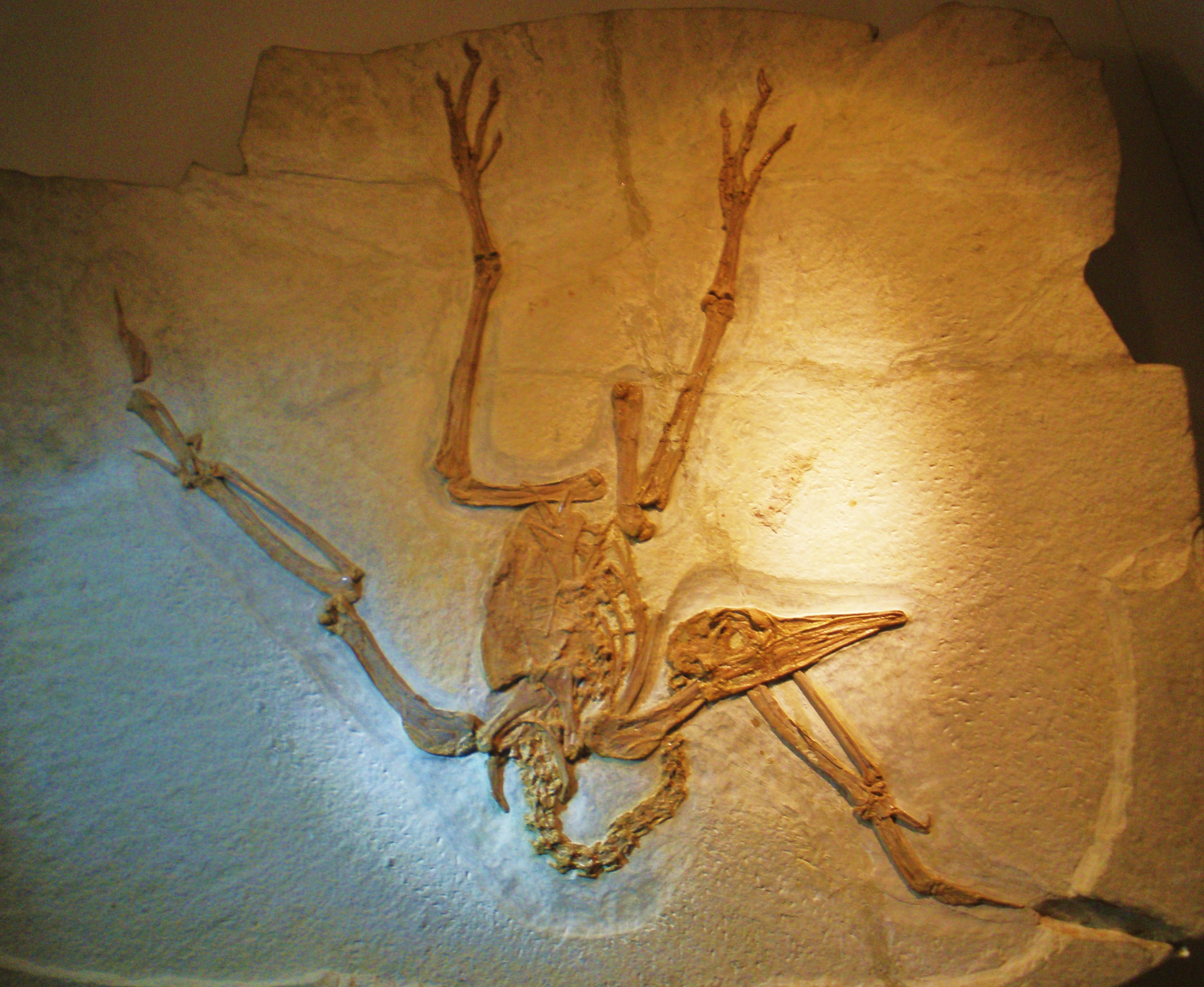
Cast at Aathal Dinosaur Museum

Pseudocrypturus means false tinamou. The type species name, cercanaxius, comes from ancient Greek words kerkion, tail, and anaxios, worthless, in reference to the rudimentary pygostyle of the species.
