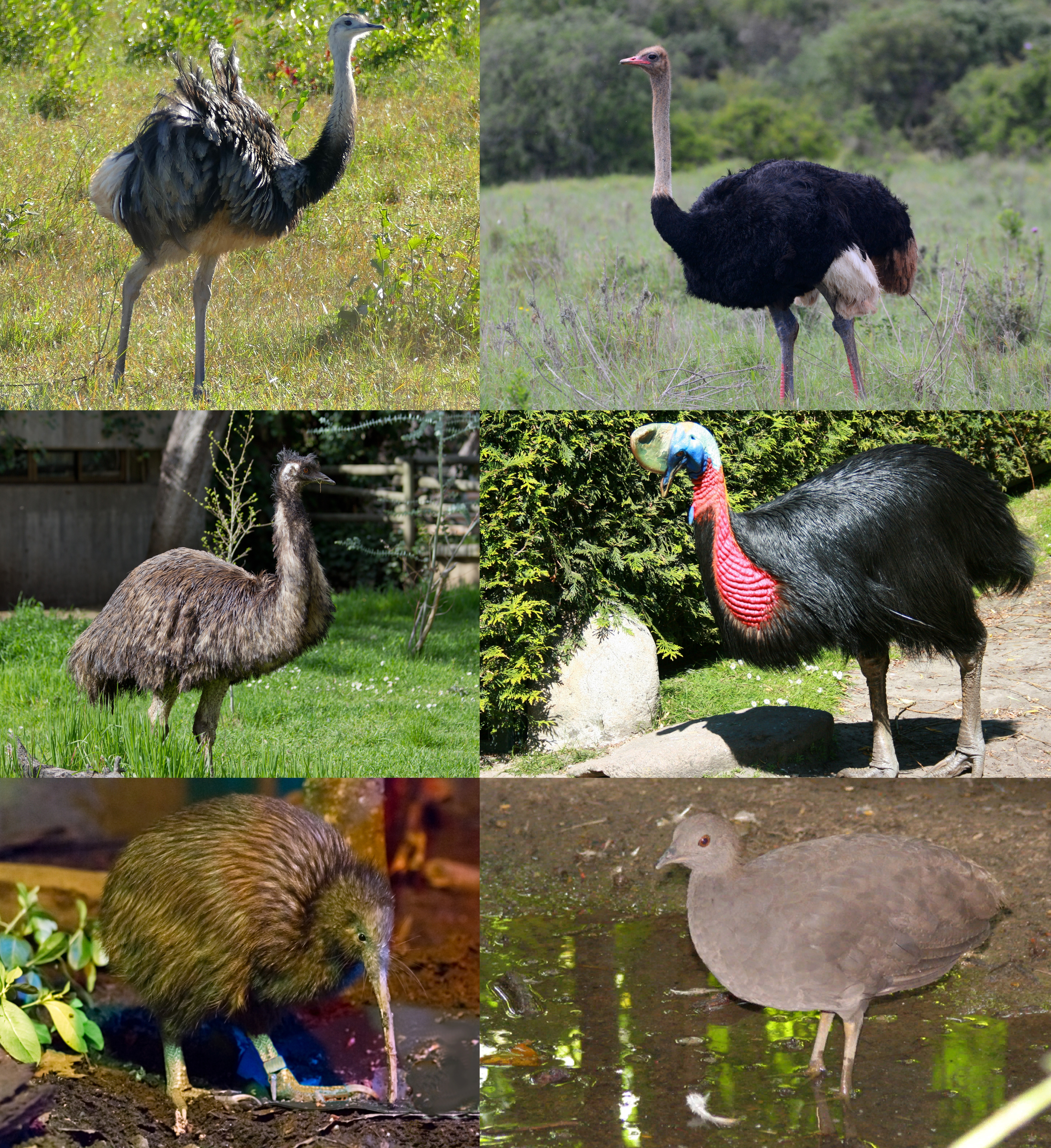
- Palaeognathae biodiversity. (Note: First row: Rhea americana, a greater rhea (Rheidae); Struthio camelus, a common ostrich (Struthionidae); second row: Dromaius novaehollandiae, an emu; Casuarius casuarius, a southern cassowary (Casuariidae); third row: Apteryx mantelli, a North Island brown kiwi (Apterygidae); Crypturellus cinereus, a cinereous tinamou (Tinamidae).)

Scientific classification
- Kingdom: Animalia
- Phylum: Chordata
- Class: Aves
- Infraclass: Palaeognathae; Pycraft, 1900

Orders
- Struthioniformes (ostriches); †Lithornithiformes (paraphyletic?); Notopalaeognathae Yuri et al., 2013; Rheiformes (rheas); †Aepyornithiformes (elephant birds); Apterygiformes (kiwis); Casuariiformes (emus and cassowaries); Dinocrypturi Sangster et al., 2022; †Dinornithiformes (moas); Tinamiformes (tinamous)

= Palaeognathae =

Paleognaths Temporal range: Paleocene – Holocene, 60–0 Ma

Infraclass of birds

Palaeognathae (/ˌpæliˈɒɡnəθi/; from Ancient Greek παλαιός (palaiós) 'old' and γνάθος (gnáthos) 'jaw') is an infraclass of birds, called paleognaths or palaeognaths. It is one of the two infraclasses of birds, the other being Neognathae, both of which form Neornithes (equivalent to the class Aves in a narrow sense). Palaeognathae contains five extant orders consisting of four flightless lineages (plus two that are extinct), termed ratites, and one flying lineage, the Neotropic tinamous. There are 47 species of tinamous, five of kiwis (Apteryx), three of cassowaries (Casuarius), one of emus (Dromaius) (another became extinct in historic times), two of rheas (Rhea) and two of ostriches (Struthio). Recent research has indicated that paleognaths are monophyletic but the traditional taxonomic split between flightless and flighted forms is incorrect; tinamous are within the ratite radiation, meaning flightlessness arose independently multiple times via parallel evolution.

There are three extinct groups that are undisputed members of Palaeognathae: the Lithornithiformes, the Dinornithiformes (moas) and the Aepyornithiformes (elephant birds), the latter two of which became extinct in the last 1250 years. There are other extinct birds which have been allied with the Palaeognathae by at least one author, but their affinities are a matter of dispute.

The word paleognath is derived from the Ancient Greek for 'old jaws' in reference to the skeletal anatomy of the palate, which was historically considered more primitive than other birds, though it has recently been argued the ancestor of all living birds had a neognath-type palate. Paleognathous birds retain some basal morphological characters but are by no means living fossils as their genomes continued to evolve at the DNA level under selective pressure at rates comparable to the Neognathae branch of living birds, though there is some controversy about the precise relationship between them and the other birds. There are also several other scientific controversies about their evolution (see below).

== Origin and evolution ==
No unambiguously paleognathous fossil birds are known until the Cenozoic (though birds occasionally interpreted as lithornithids occur in Albian appalachian sites), but there have been many reports of putative paleognaths, and it has long been inferred that they may have evolved in the Cretaceous. Given the Northern Hemisphere location of the morphologically most basal fossil forms (such as Lithornis, Pseudocrypturus, Paracathartes and Palaeotis), a Laurasian origin for the group can be inferred. The present almost entirely Gondwanan distribution would then have resulted from multiple colonisations of the southern landmasses by flying forms that subsequently evolved flightlessness, and in many cases, gigantism.

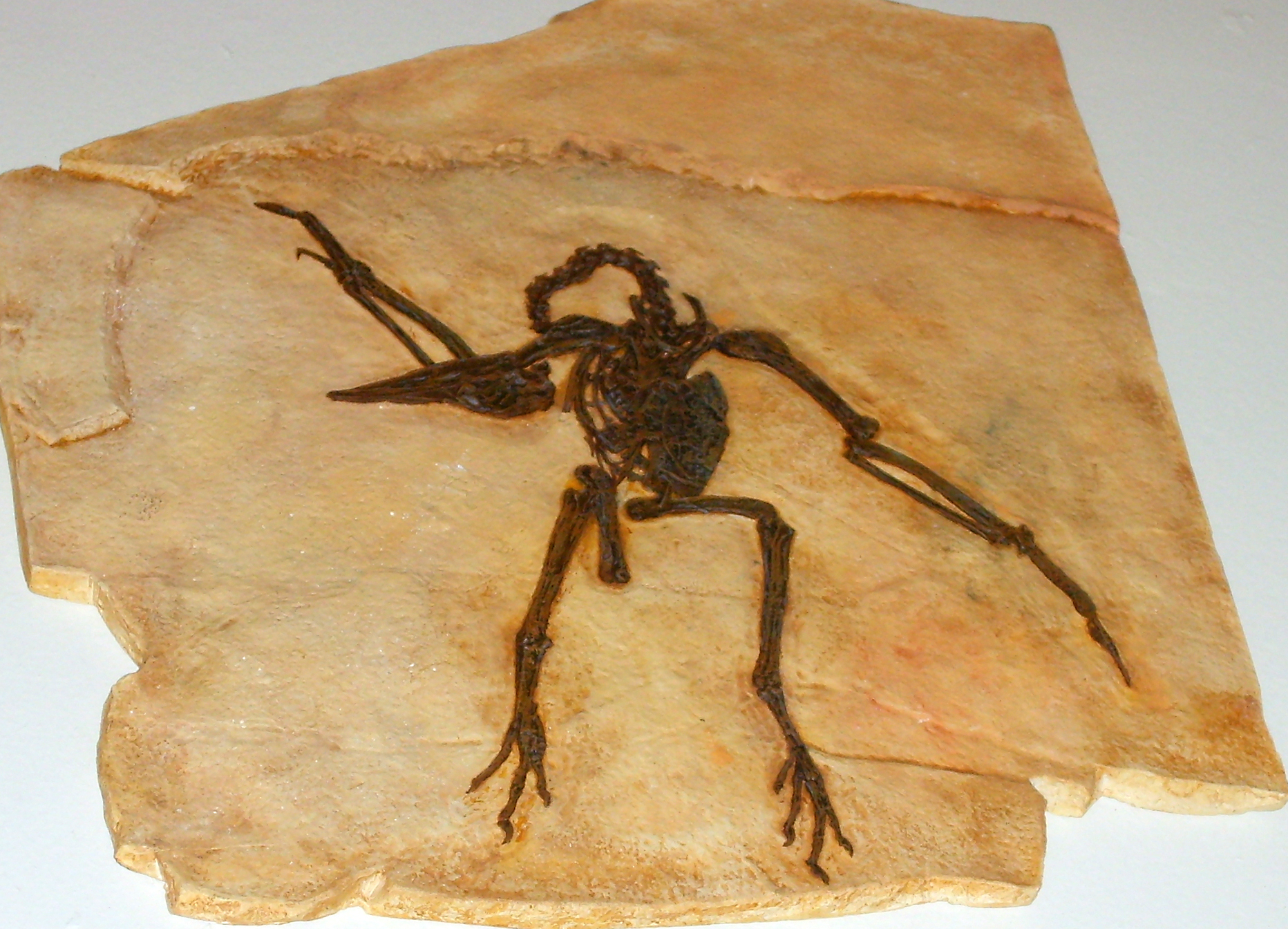
Pseudocrypturus cercanaxius fossil cast, Copenhagen Zoological Museum

One study of molecular and paleontological data found that modern bird orders, including the paleognathous ones, began diverging from one another in the Early Cretaceous. Benton (2005) summarized this and other molecular studies as implying that paleognaths should have arisen 110 to 120 million years ago in the Early Cretaceous. He points out, however, that there is no fossil record until 70 million years ago, leaving a 45 million year gap. He asks whether the paleognath fossils will be found one day, or whether the estimated rates of molecular evolution are too slow, and that bird evolution actually accelerated during an adaptive radiation after the Cretaceous–Paleogene boundary (K–Pg boundary).

Before the advent of genetic analysis, some authors questioned the monophyly of the Palaeognathae on various grounds, suggesting that they could be a hodgepodge of unrelated birds that have come to be grouped together because they are coincidentally flightless. Unrelated birds might have developed ratite-like anatomies multiple times around the world through convergent evolution. McDowell (1948) asserted that the similarities in the palate anatomy of paleognaths might actually be neoteny, or retained embryonic features. He noted that there were other features of the skull, such as the retention of sutures into adulthood, that were like those of juvenile birds. Thus, perhaps the characteristic palate was actually a frozen stage that many carinate bird embryos passed through during development. The retention of early developmental stages, then, may have been a mechanism by which various birds became flightless and came to look similar to one another.

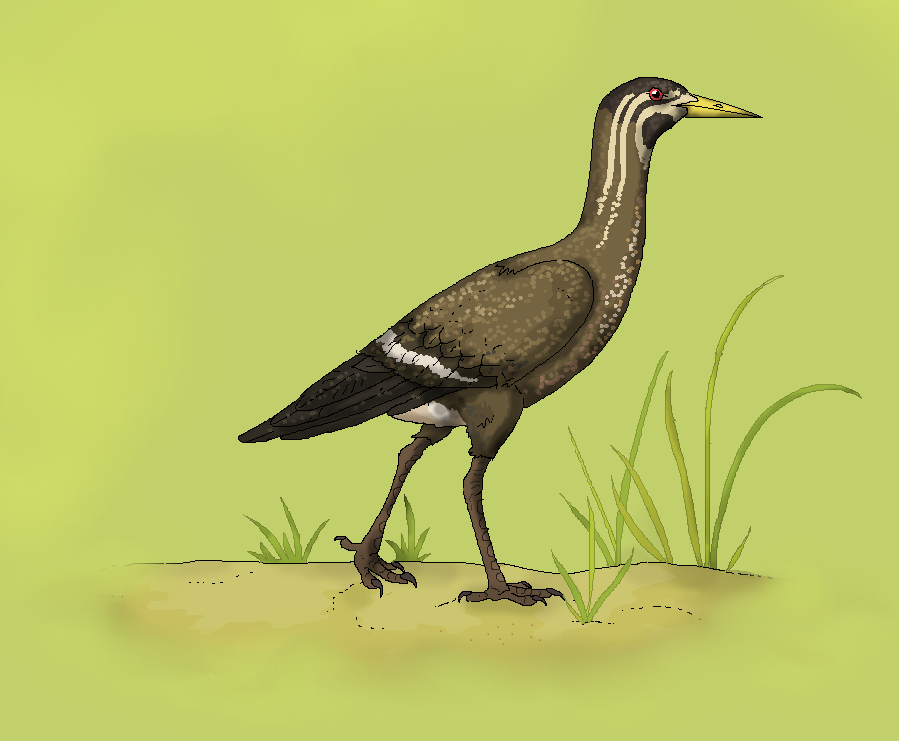
Life restoration of Lithornis.

Hope (2002) reviewed all known bird fossils from the Mesozoic looking for evidence of the origin of the evolutionary radiation of the Neornithes. That radiation would also signal that the paleognaths had already diverged. She notes five Early Cretaceous taxa that have been assigned to the Palaeognathae. She finds that none of them can be clearly assigned as such. However, she does find evidence that the Neognathae and, therefore, also the Palaeognathae had diverged no later than the Early Campanian age of the Cretaceous period.

Vegavis is a fossil bird from the Maastrichtian stage of Late Cretaceous Antarctica. Vegavis is most closely related to true ducks. Because virtually all phylogenetic analyses predict that ducks diverged after paleognaths, this is evidence that paleognaths had already arisen well before that time.

An exceptionally preserved specimen of the extinct flying paleognathe Lithornis was published by Leonard et al. in 2005. It is an articulated and nearly complete fossil from the early Eocene of Denmark, and thought to have the best preserved lithornithiform skull ever found. The authors concluded that Lithornis was a close sister taxon to tinamous, rather than ostriches, and that the lithornithiforms + tinamous were sister to the other paleognaths. They concluded that all ratites, therefore, were monophyletic, descending from one common ancestor that became flightless. They also interpret the paleognath-like Limenavis, from late Cretaceous Patagonia, as possible evidence of a Cretaceous and monophyletic origin for paleognaths.

Mysterious large eggs from the Pliocene of Lanzarote in the Canary Islands have been attributed to ratites.

An ambitious genomic analysis of the living birds was performed in 2007, and it contradicted Leonard et al. (2005). It found that tinamous are not primitive within the paleognaths, but among the most advanced. This requires multiple events of flightlessness within the paleognaths and partially refutes the Gondwana vicariance hypothesis (see below). The study looked at DNA sequences from 19 loci in 169 species. It recovered evidence that the paleognaths are one natural group (monophyletic), and that their divergence from other birds is the oldest divergence of any extant bird groups. It also placed the tinamous within the ratites, more derived than ostriches, or rheas and as a sister group to emus and kiwis, and this makes ratites paraphyletic.

A related study addressed the issue of paleognath phylogeny exclusively. It used molecular analysis and looked at twenty unlinked nuclear genes. This study concluded that there were at least three events of flightlessness that produced the different ratite orders, that the similarities between the ratite orders are partly due to convergent evolution, and that the Palaeognathae are monophyletic, but the ratites are not.

Beginning in 2010, DNA analysis studies have shown that tinamous are the sister group to extinct moa of New Zealand.

A 2020 molecular study of all bird orders found paleognaths and neognaths to have diverged in the Late Cretaceous or earlier, before 70 million years ago. However, all modern paleognath orders only originated in the latest Paleocene and afterwards, with ostriches diverging in the latest Paleocene, rheas in the early Eocene, kiwis (and presumably elephant birds) very shortly after in the early Eocene, and finally Casuariiformes and tinamous (and presumably moas) diverging from one another in the mid-Eocene.

=== History of classifications ===
In the history of biology there have been many competing taxonomies of the birds now included in the Palaeognathae. The topic has been studied by Dubois (1891), Sharpe (1891), Shufeldt (1904), Sibley and Ahlquist (1972, 1981) and Cracraft (1981).

Merrem (1813) is often credited with classifying the paleognaths together, and he coined the taxon "Ratitae" (see above). However, Linnaeus (1758) placed cassowaries, emus, ostriches, and rheas together in Struthio. Lesson (1831) added the kiwis to the Ratitae. Parker (1864) reported the similarities of the palates of the tinamous and ratites, but Huxley (1867) is more widely credited with this insight. Huxley still placed the tinamous with the Carinatae of Merrem because of their keeled sterna, and thought that they were most closely related to the Galliformes.

Pycraft (1900) presented a major advance when he coined the term Palaeognathae. He rejected the Ratitae-Carinatae classification that separated tinamous and ratites. He reasoned that a keelless, or "ratite", sternum could easily evolve in unrelated birds that independently became flightless. He also recognized that the ratites were secondarily flightless. His subdivisions were based on the characters of the palatal skeleton and other organ systems. He established seven roughly modern orders of living and fossil paleognaths (Casuarii, Struthiones, Rheae, Dinornithes, Aepyornithes, Apteryges, and Crypturi – the latter his term for tinamous, after the Tinamou genus Crypturellus).

The Palaeognathae are usually considered a superorder, but authors have treated them as a taxon as high as subclass (Stresemann 1927–1934) or as low as an order (Cracraft 1981 and the IUCN, which includes all paleognaths in an expanded Struthioniformes). Palaeognathae was defined in the PhyloCode by George Sangster and colleagues in 2022 as "the least inclusive crown clade containing Tinamus major and Struthio camelus".

=== Cladistics ===
Current consensus of palaeognath relationships after Takezaki et al. 2023 and Kück and Suh 2026, showing polytomy at the base of Notopalaeognathae.

- Paleognathae
  - Struthionidae (ostriches)
  - Notopalaeognathae
    - Rheidae (rheas)
    - Dinocrypturi
      - Tinamidae (tinamou)
      - †Dinornithiformes (moa)
    - - Apterygidae (kiwis)
      - †Aepyornithiformes (elephant birds)
    - Casuariiformes
      - Casuarius (Cassowary)
      - Dromaius (Emu)

It is widely accepted that ostriches are the earliest diverging branch of living palaeognaths, but the relationships among the remaining groups of paleognaths, which belong to a clade named Notopalaeognathae (named by Yuri et al. (2013)), remains uncertain, likely due to rapid divergences between the notopalaeognath lineages only leaving weak genetic signals. Four major groups remain accepted within Notopalaeognathae, rheas, a clade comprising tinamou and moa (given the clade name Dinocrypturi by Sangster et al. (2022)), the clade comprising elephant birds and kiwi (unnamed), and the Casuariiformes (the clade formed by emu and cassowaries). Novaeratitae has been proposed as a clade uniting the Casuariiformes, elephant birds and kiwi, to the exclusion of other notopalaeognath groups. Novaeratitae has been contested by other studies, which find the relationships between the four main clades of non-ostrich palaeognaths (moa+tinamou, kiwi+elephant bird, rheas, and emus+cassowaries) to be an unresolved polytomy. Cladogram following Novaeratitae hypothesis, after Takezaki et al 2023.

- Palaeognathae
  - Struthioniformes (Ostriches)
  - Notopalaeognathae
    - Rheiformes (Rhea)
    - - Dinocrypturi
        - Dinornithiformes† (Moa)
        - Tinamiformes (Tinamous)
      - Novaeratitae
        - - Aepyornithiformes† (Elephant bird)
          - Apterygiformes (Kiwi)
        - Casuariiformes
          - Casuarius (Cassowary)
          - Dromaius (Emu)

Cloutier, A. et al. (2019) in their molecular study places ostriches as sister to other palaeognaths, with the rhea as the sister lineage to the remaining, non-ostrich palaeognaths.

An alternative phylogeny was found by Kuhl, H. et al. (2020). In this treatment, all members of Palaeognathae are classified in Struthioniformes, but they are still shown as distinct orders here.

- Palaeognathae
  - Struthioniformes (Ostriches)
  - Notopalaeognathae
    - Rheiformes (Rhea)
    - Novaeratitae
      - - Aepyornithiformes† (Elephant bird)
        - Apterygiformes (Kiwi)
      - - - Dinornithiformes† (Moa)
          - Tinamiformes (Tinamous)
        - Casuariiformes
          - Casuarius (Cassowary)
          - Dromaius (Emu)

Kück and Suh 2026 instead suggested that Dinocrypturi may be the earliest diverging lineage of notopalaeognaths instead, though they noted support for this hypothesis was weak.

== Description ==
Paleognaths are named for a characteristic, complex architecture of the bones in the bony palate. Cracraft (1974) defined it with five characters.

1. The vomer is large and articulates with the premaxillae and maxillopalatines anteriorly. Posteriorly the vomer fuses to the ventral surface of the pterygoid, and the palatines fuse to the ventral surface of this pterygovomer articulation.
2. The pterygoid prevents the palatine from articulating medially with the basisphenoid.
3. The palatine and pterygoid fuse into a rigid joint.
4. The articulation on the pterygoid for the basipterygoid process of the basicranium is located near the articulation between the pterygoid and quadrate.
5. The pterygoid–quadrate articulation is complex and includes the orbital process of the quadrate.

Paleognaths share similar pelvis anatomy. There is a large, open ilio–ischiatic fenestra in the pelvis. The pubis and ischium are likely to be longer than the ilium, protruding out beneath the tail. The postacetabular portion of the pelvis is longer than the preacetabular portion.

Paleognaths share a pattern of grooves in the horny covering of the bill. This covering is called the rhamphotheca. The paleognath pattern has one central strip of horn, with long, triangular, strips to either side.

In paleognaths, the male incubates the eggs. The male may include in his nest the eggs of one female or more than one. He may also have eggs deposited in his nest by females that did not breed with him, in cases of nest parasitism. Only in ostriches and the great spotted kiwi does the female also assist in incubating the eggs.

The tinamous of Central and South America are primarily terrestrial, though they fly weakly. Tinamous have very short tail feathers, giving them an almost tailless aspect. In general, they resemble galliform birds like quails and grouse.

Tinamous have a very long, keeled, breastbone with an unusual three-pronged shape. This bone, the sternum, has a central blade (the Carina sterni), with two long, slender lateral trabeculae, which curve to either side and nearly touch the keel posteriorly. These trabeculae may also be thought of as the rims of two large foramina that incise the posterior edge of the sternum, and extend almost its whole length. Tinamous have a proper semicircular furcula, with no trace of a hypocleidium. There is an acute angle between the scapula and coracoid, as in all flying birds. The pelvis has an open ilio–ischiatic fenestra that incises the posterior edge between the ilium and ischium, as in all paleognaths. Tinamous have no true pygostyle, their caudal vertebrae remain unfused, as in ratites.

Tinamou feathers look like those of volant birds in that they have a rachis and two vanes. The structure of tinamou feathers is unique, however, in that they have barbs that remain joined at their tips. Thus the parallel barbs are separated only by slits between them. Tinamous have uropygial glands.

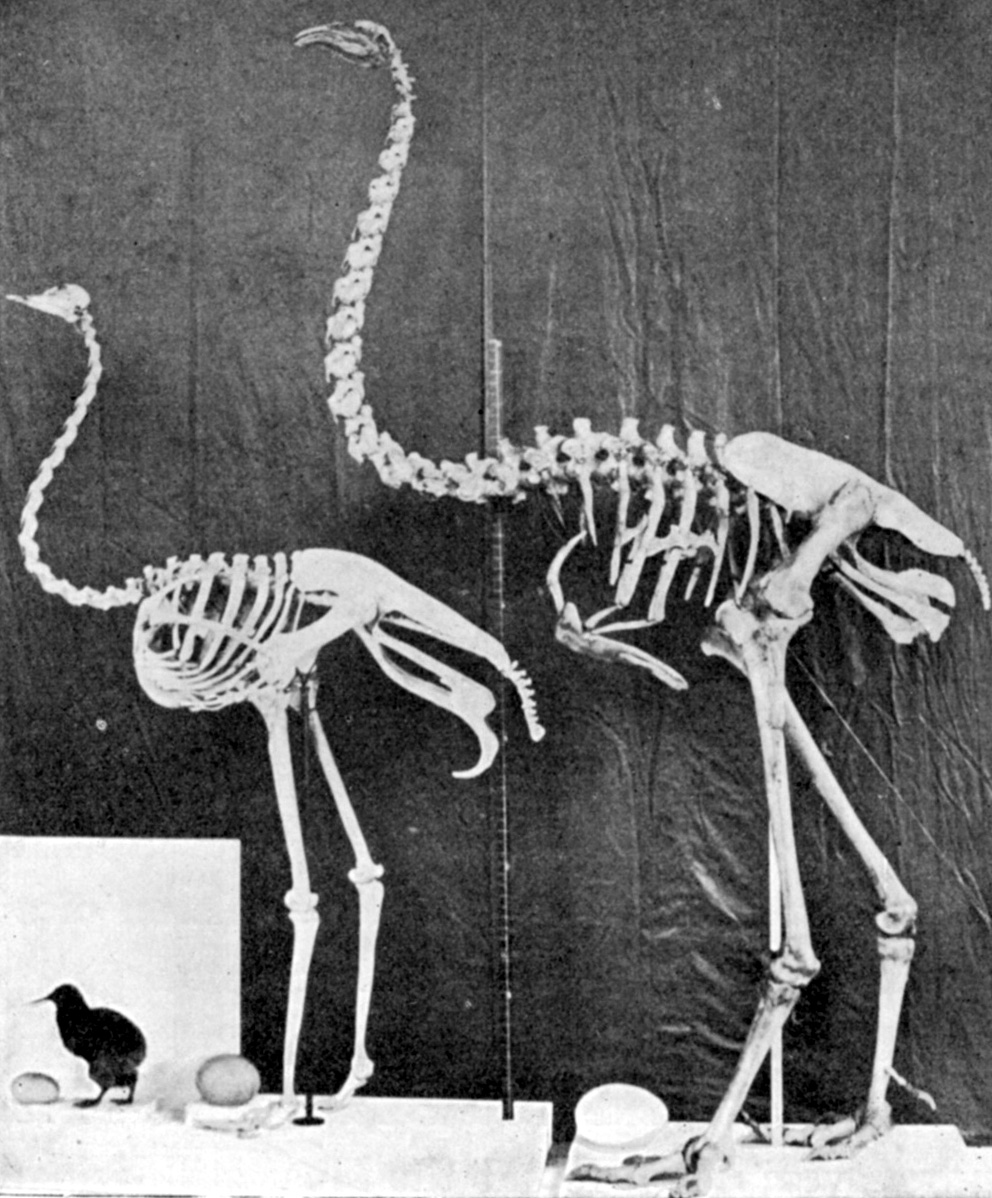
Comparison of a kiwi, ostrich, and Dinornis, each with its egg

Ratite birds are strictly flightless and their anatomy reflects specializations for terrestrial life. The term "ratite" is from the Latin word for raft, ratis, because they possess a flat breastbone, or sternum, shaped like a raft. This characteristic sternum differs from that in flighted birds, where the pectoral musculature is disproportionately large to provide the power for wingbeats and the sternum develops a prominent keel, or carina sterni to anchor these muscles. The clavicles do not fuse into a furcula. Instead, if present at all, each is splint-like and lies along the medial border of the coracoid, attached there by a coraco–clavicular ligament. There is an obtuse angle between the scapula and coracoid, and the two bones fuse together to form a scapulocoracoid. Ratites have reduced and simplified wing structures and strong legs. Except in some rhea wing feathers, the barb filaments that make up the vanes of the feathers do not lock tightly together, giving the plumage a shaggier look and making it unnecessary to oil their feathers. Adult ratites have no preen gland (uropygial gland) that contains preening oil.

Paleognaths as a whole tend to have proportionally small brains, and are among the living birds with the most limited cognitive abilities. Kiwis are exceptional, however, and have large brains comparable to those of parrots and songbirds, though evidence for similar levels of behaviour complexity is currently lacking.

=== Sizes ===
Living members of Palaeognathae range from 6 inches (15 cm) to 9 feet (2.7 m) and weight can be from .09 to 345 pounds (0.0–156.5 kg). Ostriches are the largest struthioniforms (members of the order Struthioniformes), with long legs and neck. They range in height from 5.7 to 9 feet (1.7–2.7 m) and weigh from 139 to 345 pounds (63–156 kg). They have loose-feathered wings. Males have black and white feathers while the female has grayish brown feathers. They are unique among birds in that they retain only the third and fourth toe on each foot. Ostrich wings have claws, or unguals, on the first and second fingers (and, in some individuals, also on the third). Ostriches differ from other paleognaths in that they have a reduced vomer bone of the skull.

Emus are 1.5–1.9 m (4.9–6.2 ft) in height and weigh 33 kg on average. They have short wings and the adults have brown feathers.

Rheas are 1.1–1.8 m (3.6–5.9 ft) and weigh 15–40 kg (33–88 lb). Their feathers are gray or spotted brown and white. They have large wings but no tail feathers. They have no clavicles.

Cassowaries are 1.27–1.7 m (4.2–5.6 ft) in height and weigh 29–59 kg (64–130 lb). They have rudimentary wings with black feathers and six stiff, porcupine-like, quills in the place of their primary and secondary feathers.

Kiwis are the smallest of ratites, ranging in height from 14 to 22 inches (36–56 cm) and weight 2.6 to 8.6 pounds (1.2–3.9 kg). They have shaggy brown feathers.

Tinamous range in size from 8 to 21 inches (20–53 cm) and weigh 1.4 to 5 pounds (640–2,270 g).

=== Locomotion ===
Many of the larger ratite birds have extremely long legs and the largest living bird, the ostrich, can run at speeds over 35 mph (60 km/h). Emus have long, strong legs and can run up to 30 mph (48 km/h). Cassowaries and rheas show a similar likeness in agility and some extinct forms may have reached speeds of 45 mph (75 km/h).

== Biogeography ==
Today, the ratites are largely restricted to the Southern Hemisphere, though across the Cenozoic they were also present in Europe, North America and Asia. In the Cretaceous, these southern continents were connected, forming a single continent called Gondwana. Gondwana is the crucial territory in a major scientific question about the evolution of Palaeognathae, and thus about the evolution of all of the Neornithes.

There are two theories regarding the evolution of paleognaths. According to the Gondwana vicariance hypothesis, the paleognaths evolved once, from one ancestor, on Gondwana during the Cretaceous, and then rode on the daughter landmasses that became today's southern continents. This hypothesis is supported most strongly by molecular clock studies, but it is weakened by the lack of any Cretaceous or southern fossil paleognaths, as well as the early radiation of paleognaths in Laurasian landmasses. According to the Tertiary radiation hypothesis, (Note: This designation has as a part of it a term, 'Tertiary', that is now discouraged as a formal geochronological unit by the International Commission on Stratigraphy.) they evolved after the Cretaceous–Paleogene extinction event from multiple flying ancestors on multiple continents around the world. This hypothesis is supported by molecular phylogeny studies and matches the fossil record, but it is weakened by morphological phylogenetic studies. Both hypotheses have been supported and challenged by many studies by many authors.

A 2016 study of both genetic and morphological divergence concludes that the group had a Laurasian origin.

=== Gondwana vicariance hypothesis ===
Cracraft (2001) gave a comprehensive review to the data and strongly supported the Gondwana vicariance hypothesis with phylogenetic evidence and historical biogeography. He cites molecular clock studies that show a basal divergence date for neornithes being around 100 Mya. He credits the authors of the molecular clock studies with the observation that the lack of southern paleognath fossils may correspond to the relatively scarce southern Cretaceous deposits, and the relative lack of paleontological field work in the Southern Hemisphere. Moreover, Cracraft synthesizes the morphological and molecular studies, noting conflicts between the two, and finds that the bulk of the evidence favors paleognath monophyly. He also notes distributional patterns and hypotheses regarding patterns of phylogenetic relatedness are consistent with the paleognaths and neognaths having diverged in Gondwana.

Geological analyses have suggested that New Zealand may have been entirely under water as recently as 28 Mya, making it impossible for flightless birds to have survived. However, the discovery of a Sphenodon fossil dating to the Early Miocene 19–16 Mya raises question as to whether the island mass was completely submerged. This finding offers further evidence that ancient Sphenodon species lived on some portion of the land mass since it separated from Gondwana approximately 82 Mya. Evidence of a sea level rise submerging much of New Zealand is generally accepted, but there is a debate about how much of New Zealand was submerged. A Sphenodon species surviving on a remnant part of the island suggests that larger species may have survived as well.

Ultimately, the earliest recorded paleognaths are flying, presumably plesiomorphic lithornithids, found quite possibly as early as the Late Cretaceous in North America, while some of the earliest flightless ratites occur in Europe. The vicariance hypothesis relies on the assumption southern landmasses were more relevant to ratite evolution than the northern ones.

=== Tertiary radiation hypothesis ===
Feduccia (1995) emphasized the extinction event at the Cretaceous-Paleogene boundary as the probable engine of diversification in the Neornithes, picturing only one or very few lineages of birds surviving the end of the Cretaceous. He also noted that birds around the world had developed ratite-like anatomies when they became flightless, and saw the affinities of modern ratites, especially kiwis, as ambiguous. In this emphasis on the Cenozoic, rather than Cretaceous period, as the time of basal divergences between neornithines, he follows Olson.

Houde demonstrated that the Lithornithiformes, a group of flying birds that were common in the Cenozoic of the Northern Hemisphere, were also paleognaths. He argues that the lithornithiform bird Paleotis, known from fossils in Denmark (Northern Hemisphere), shared unique anatomical features of the skull that make it a member of the same order as the ostriches. He also argued that the kiwis should not have reached New Zealand, which moved away from the mainland in the Early Cretaceous, if their ancestor was flightless; this claim at least has been vindicated by the discovery of the possibly volant Proapteryx. He therefore deduced that lithornithiform ancestors could have reached the southern continents some 30 to 40 million years ago, and evolved flightless forms which are today's ratites. This hypothesis is contradicted by some later molecular studies, but supported by others.

== Relationship to humans ==
The human lineage evolved in Africa in sympatry with ostriches. After Homo appeared and left Africa for other continents, they continued to encounter ostriches in Arabia and much of southern and central Asia. No contact was made with other palaeognath genera until the Papuan and Aboriginal Australian peoples populated New Guinea and Australia. Subsequently, Paleo-Indians encountered tinamous and rheas in Central and South America, Austronesian settlers encountered and exterminated the elephant birds of Madagascar, and the Maori did likewise to the moa of New Zealand. The giant ratites of Madagascar and New Zealand had evolved with little or no exposure to mammalian predators, and were unable to cope with predation by humans; many other oceanic species met the same fate (as apparently had the Australian dromornithids earlier). Worldwide, most giant birds became extinct by the end of the 18th century and most surviving species are now endangered and/or are decreasing in population. However, the co-existence between elephant birds and human beings appears to have been longer than previously thought.

Today, ratites such as the ostrich are farmed and sometimes even kept as pets. Ratites play a large role in human culture; they are farmed, eaten, raced, protected, and kept in zoos.

== See also ==
- Flightless bird
- List of fossil bird genera
- List of Late Quaternary prehistoric bird species
- List of recently extinct bird species
