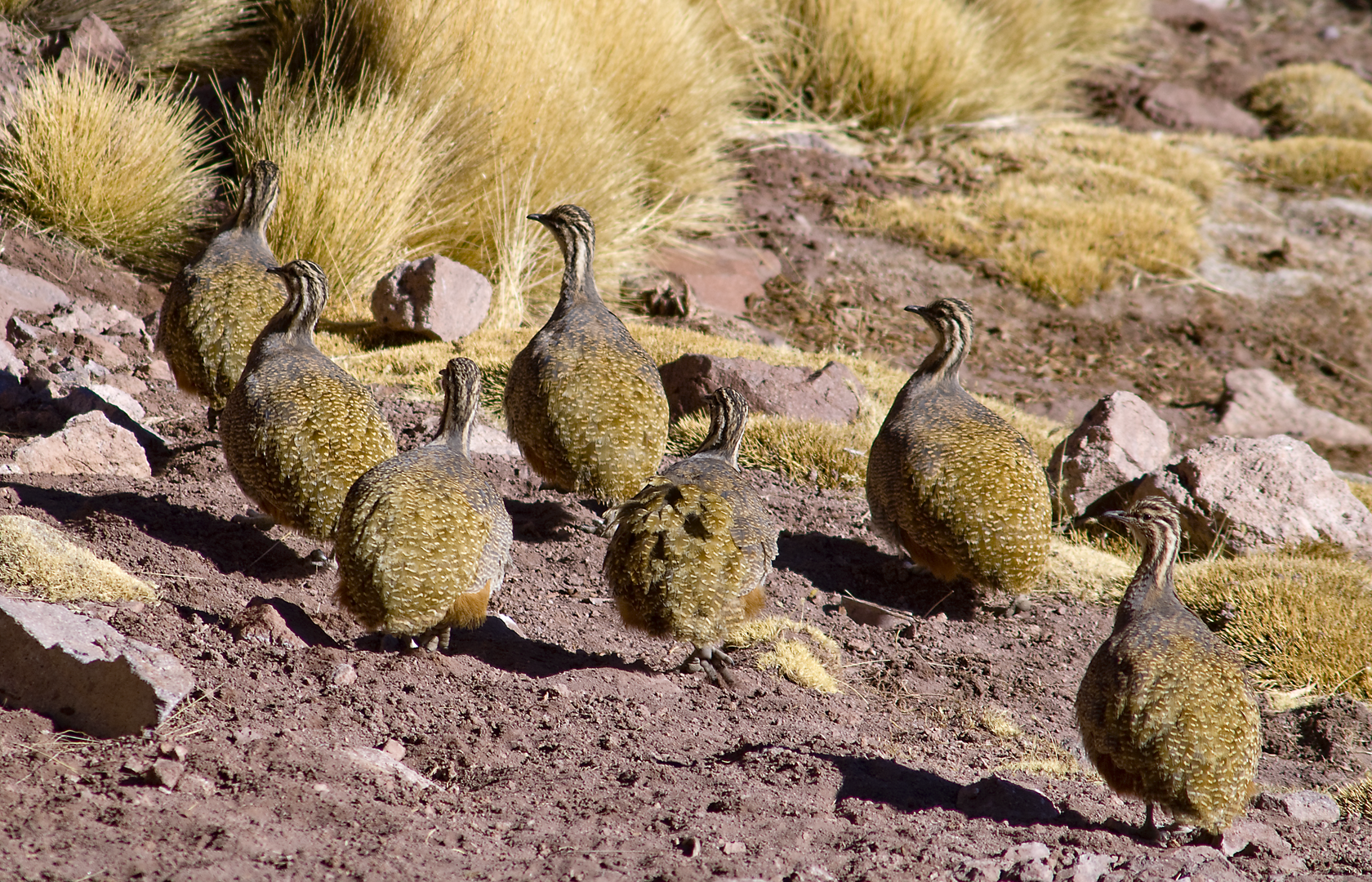

Conservation status
- Least Concern (IUCN 3.1)

Scientific classification
- Kingdom: Animalia
- Phylum: Chordata
- Class: Aves
- Infraclass: Palaeognathae
- Order: Tinamiformes
- Family: Tinamidae
- Genus: Tinamotis
- Species: T. pentlandii

Binomial name
- Tinamotis pentlandii Vigors, 1837

= Puna tinamou =

Species of bird

The Puna tinamou (Tinamotis pentlandii), also known as Pentland's tinamou, is a terrestrial bird, member of the tinamou family, Tinamidae. This species is native and a full-time resident of the Andes Mountains in South America. The IUCN lists this species as Least Concern, with an occurrence range of 1,010,000 km^{2} (390,000 sq mi).

== Description ==
The tinamou family consists of round- bodied, tridactyl (3-toed), ground-dwelling birds with short legs and a small stubby tail. Puna tinamous are relatively large compared to other tinamous, measuring around 40cm long and weighing around 970g. The species is a case of sexual monomorphism; Females and males look identical.

=== Plumage ===
Adults have dark gray-brown upperparts mixed with cinnamon brown patches and speckled with small cream dots and bars. Their lower back and upper side of the tail are more pale olive yellow, mimicking vegetation found in their habitat. Their lower belly and underpart of their tail are bright cinnamon red, while their upper belly is pale white with many small black streaks. Their head has two well defined cream-white stripes on the side that go around their eyes and down the neck. The top of their head is streaked with brown and cream feathers. Their throat is cream-colored.

Immature individuals have similar plumage to adults but with less defined patterns and paler colors.

== Taxonomy ==
The Tinamidae family is believed to have appeared around 35 Mya and is traditionally split into two subfamilies; Tinaminae (live in forest environments) and Nothurinae (live in open areas).

The puna tinamou is a monotypic species, meaning there is no recognized subspecies or lower infraspecific taxa. It is one of the two species of the Tinamotis genus, which itself is one of the six genera of the Nothurinae subfamily. Both of the Tinamotis species (Puna tinamou and Patagonian tinamou) are morphologically similar, with slight plumage differences but do not geographically overlap.

The name “Puna”, word of Quechua origin, refers to the species’ habitat: puna grasslands. The alternative name of the species, “Pentland”, commemorates the Irish natural scientist Joseph Barclay Pentland (1797–1873), given by Nicholas Aylward Vigors in 1837.

== Distribution and habitat ==
The puna tinamou’s habitat is defined by the high-altitude grassland plateau (puna grassland) that separates the forest and the snow in the Andes Mountains between 3,800 to 4,800m. The vegetation is relatively low, consisting mostly of adapted “cushion plants”.

Puna grasslands are located at 4,000 to 4,700 m (13,100–15,400 ft), which is habitat with the highest altitude of all tinamou species. Groups will however move to lower valleys during harsh weather. Its range is Peru, northern Bolivia, northern Chile and northwestern Argentina.

== Behavior ==
Most tinamous, prioritize walking or running rather than flight, as they are weak flyers. Puna tinamous move around in social flocks, like most species of Nothurinae, as being in a larger group has advantages against potential predators (such as Andean foxes or Variable Hawks) in open areas.

=== Vocalizations ===
Vocalizations in Puna tinamous will consist of shrill calls, similar to other Nothurinae tinamous. They are used for courtship as well as notifying danger to other individuals. Local and Indigenous communities’ names for the puna tinamou stem from its’ repetitive flute-sounding “kiula kiula kiula” song.

=== Diet ===
Their diet is believed to consist almost exclusively of plants. While it has not been deeply studied, contents of Adesmia plants and grass have been found in some individuals’ stomachs in Bolivia.

=== Reproduction / breeding ===
Males follow a simultaneous polygyny (one male with multiple females for one clutch of eggs) while females follow a sequential polyandry (one female with multiple mates one after another, contributing to multiple clutches). This pattern is common among tinamous, especially Nothurinae.

Breeding period ranges from June to November depending on the population. Nests are terrestrial and very minimal, with a clutch size between five to eight eggs. Males are responsible for taking care of the eggs and the young once hatched.

== Human relations ==
The puna tinamou is traditionally hunted for food by local and Indigenous communities, yet these practices do not pose any considerable threat to the species. Agriculture is also not an issue, as no agricultural practices are held on the species’ range.

Being listed as Least Concern, there is no direct conservation action held for the puna tinamou. Nevertheless, parts of their range overlap with protected areas and national parks.
