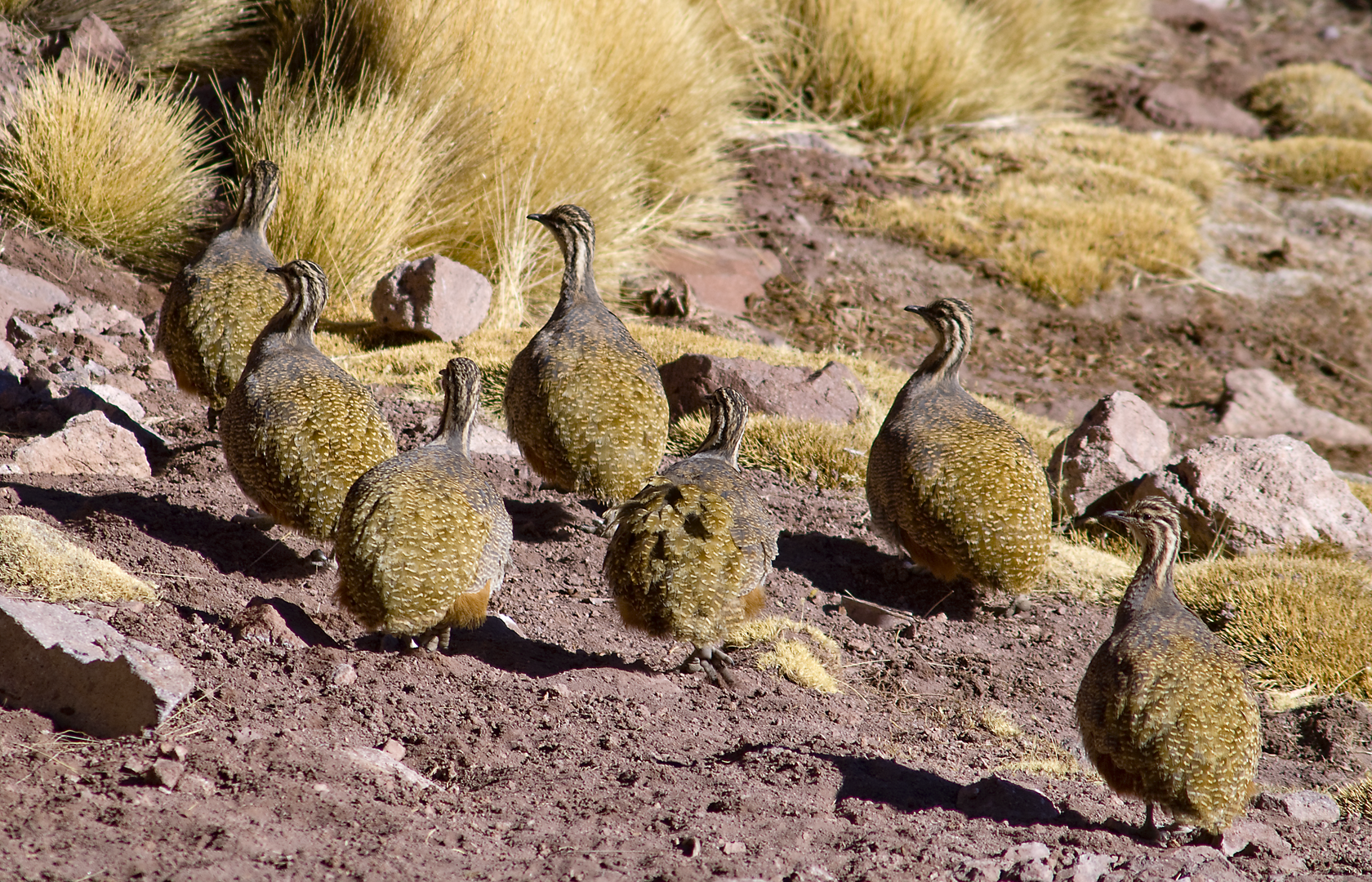
- Tinamotis pentlandii, puna tinamou

Scientific classification
- Kingdom: Animalia
- Phylum: Chordata
- Class: Aves
- Infraclass: Palaeognathae
- Order: Tinamiformes
- Family: Tinamidae
- Subfamily: Nothurinae
- Genus: Tinamotis; Vigors, 1837

Type species
- Tinamotis pentlandii Vigors, 1837

Species
- Tinamotis pentlandii Puna tinamou Tinamotis ingoufi Patagonian tinamou

= Tinamotis =

Genus of birds

Tinamotis is a genus of birds in the tinamou family.

== Taxonomy ==
All tinamou are from the family Tinamidae, and in the larger scheme are also ratites. Unlike other ratites, tinamous can fly, although in general, they are not strong fliers. All ratites evolved from prehistoric flying birds, and tinamous are the closest living relative of these birds.

=== Species ===
The species are:

Image	Scientific name	Common name	Distribution
	Tinamotis pentlandii	puna tinamou, or Pentland's tinamou	the Andes of Peru, western Bolivia, northwestern Argentina, and Chile
	Tinamotis ingoufi	Patagonian tinamou, or Ingouf's tinamou	the savanna of southwestern Argentina and southern Chile
