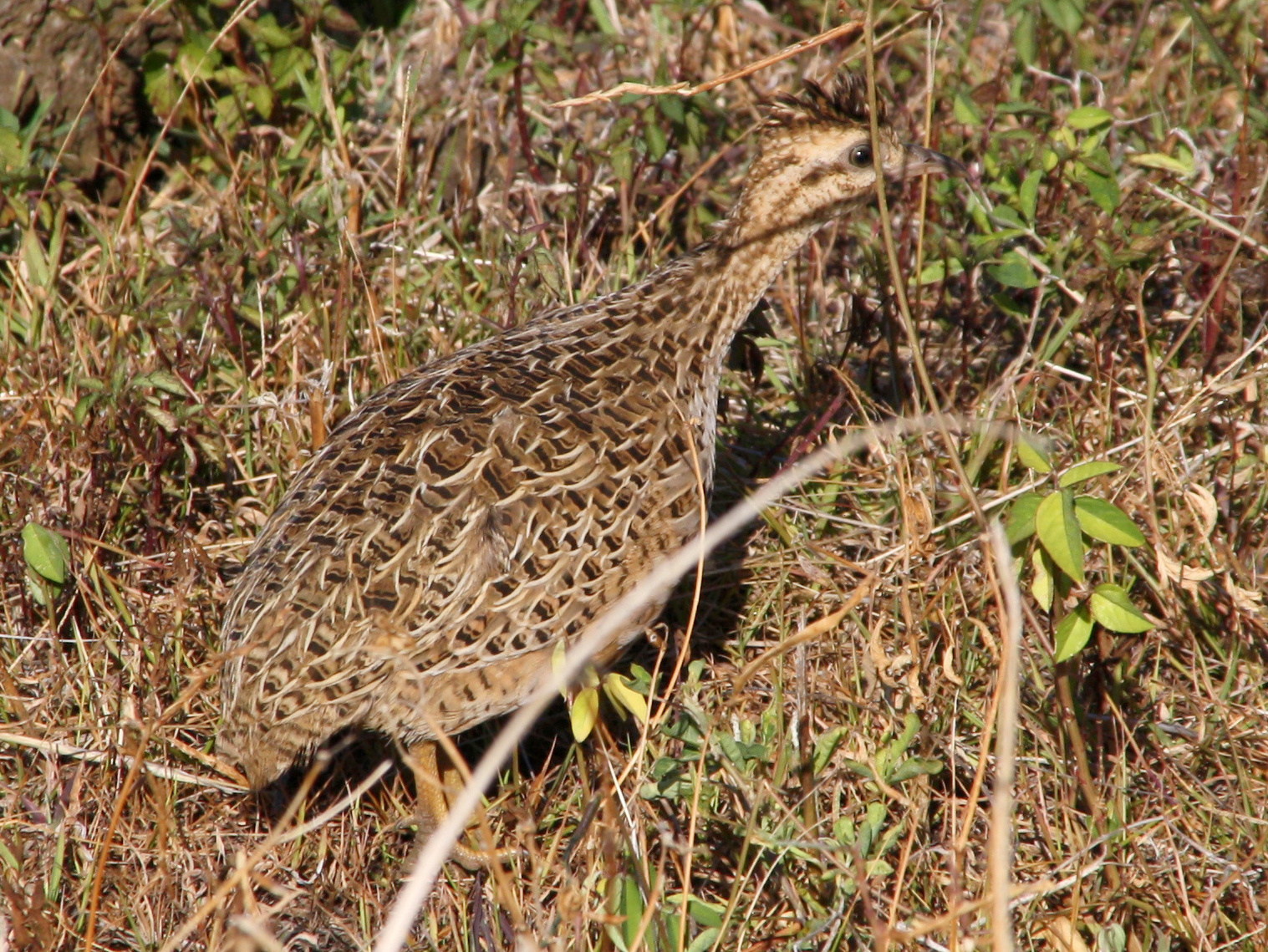

Conservation status
- Least Concern (IUCN 3.1)

Scientific classification
- Kingdom: Animalia
- Phylum: Chordata
- Class: Aves
- Infraclass: Palaeognathae
- Order: Tinamiformes
- Family: Tinamidae
- Genus: Nothoprocta
- Species: N. perdicaria

Binomial name
- Nothoprocta perdicaria (Kittlitz, 1830)

Subspecies
- N. p. perdicaria (Kittlitz, 1830); N. p. sanborni (Conover, 1924)

Synonyms
- Nothoprocta coquimbica

= Chilean tinamou =

Species of bird

The Chilean tinamou (Nothoprocta perdicaria) is a type of tinamou commonly found in high elevation shrubland in subtropical regions of central Chile.

== Taxonomy ==
All tinamous are from the family Tinamidae; in the larger scheme, they are also ratites (i.e., birds without a keel on their sternum bone), together with the South American rhea (Rhea), the cassowary (Casuarius), emu (Dromaius), ostrich (Struthio) and the kiwis (order Apterygiformes) as close, if not distant, relatives. However, unlike these terrestrial ratites, tinamou can still fly, albeit not for any sustained period or very effectively. Still, all currently extant ratite species evolved from ancient flying birds, with tinamou representing the closest living connections to these species. Additionally, the tinamou are closely aligned with the extinct giant moa (Dinornis) of New Zealand.

=== Etymology ===
Nothoprocta comes from two Ancient Greek words, nothos meaning 'spurious, counterfeit', and prōktos 'anus'. This combination of words probably has to do with the tail being small and covered with body feathers, therefore looking fake.

=== Subspecies ===
The Chilean tinamou has two subspecies, as follows:

- N. p. perdicaria, the nominate race, occurs in the semi-arid grasslands of north-central Chile; Atacama, Coquimbo, Valparaíso, Santiago, O'Higgins, Maule and Ñuble Regions.
- N. p. sanborni occurs in south-central Chile; Maule, Ñuble, Bio-bio, Araucanía Regions, the northern Los Lagos Region and adjacent Argentina

== Distribution and habitat ==
The Chilean tinamou can be found in the high elevation shrubland at 400 to 2,000 m (1,300–6,600 ft) elevation. This species is native to all of Chile except southern Los Lagos, Tarapacá, Antofagasta, Aisén, and Magallanes y Antarctica Chilena. This tinamou can also be found in arid mountain forests in association with such trees as Acacia caven, Porlieria chilensis and the endangered Jubaea chilensis. It has been introduced to Easter Island.

== Description ==
The Chilean tinamou is approximately 29 cm (11 in) in length. It is almost tail-less and is stocky in shape. It has a bill that is curved and similar to the California quail. It has thick, short, pale, yellowish legs. It generally walks upright and has "short tail and tail coverts drooping behind legs". The pattern on its upper body looks striped, but is more complex in detail. It has a buffy face with a dark eyeline that is drooping and a small strip on its cheek, with a lighter colored crown. Its neck is brown and its lower neck has dark spots. It has a complex patterns that streak on the side of the chest, which is grey. The Chilean tinamou, just south of the Maule Region, has a brownish chest instead of a grey chest and more and reddish brown stripes on its upper body and buttocks. For both regions, it has large wings that cover the body when on ground, and when flying the wings appear large and reddish brown underneath. The wings are also rounded.

It has a loud stride whistle that sounds double-syllabled and sounds like "sweee weee". When under stress, it releases a lowering series of whistles that sounds like "swee wee wee wee" along with fast-paced wing sounds.

== Behavior ==
The females lay 10–12 glossy eggs in a scrape. The male incubates the eggs and raises the chicks. The eggs are covered with feathers when left unattended. Incubation is around 21 days. The chicks are buff with dark stripes, and run soon after hatching and fly when half-grown. Later in life blue or gray spots may appear.

== Conservation ==
The IUCN classifies the Chilean tinamou as Least Concern, with an occurrence range of 120,000 km^{2} (46,000 sq mi).
