= Querandiornis =

Querandiornis Temporal range: Pleistocene

Scientific classification
- Domain: Eukaryota
- Kingdom: Animalia
- Phylum: Chordata
- Class: Aves
- Infraclass: Palaeognathae
- Order: Tinamiformes
- Family: Tinamidae
- Genus: †Querandiornis
- Species: †Q. romani

Binomial name
- †Querandiornis romani Rusconi, 1958

Extinct species of bird

Querandiornis romani was a species of Tinamid bird that lived during the Pleistocene.
