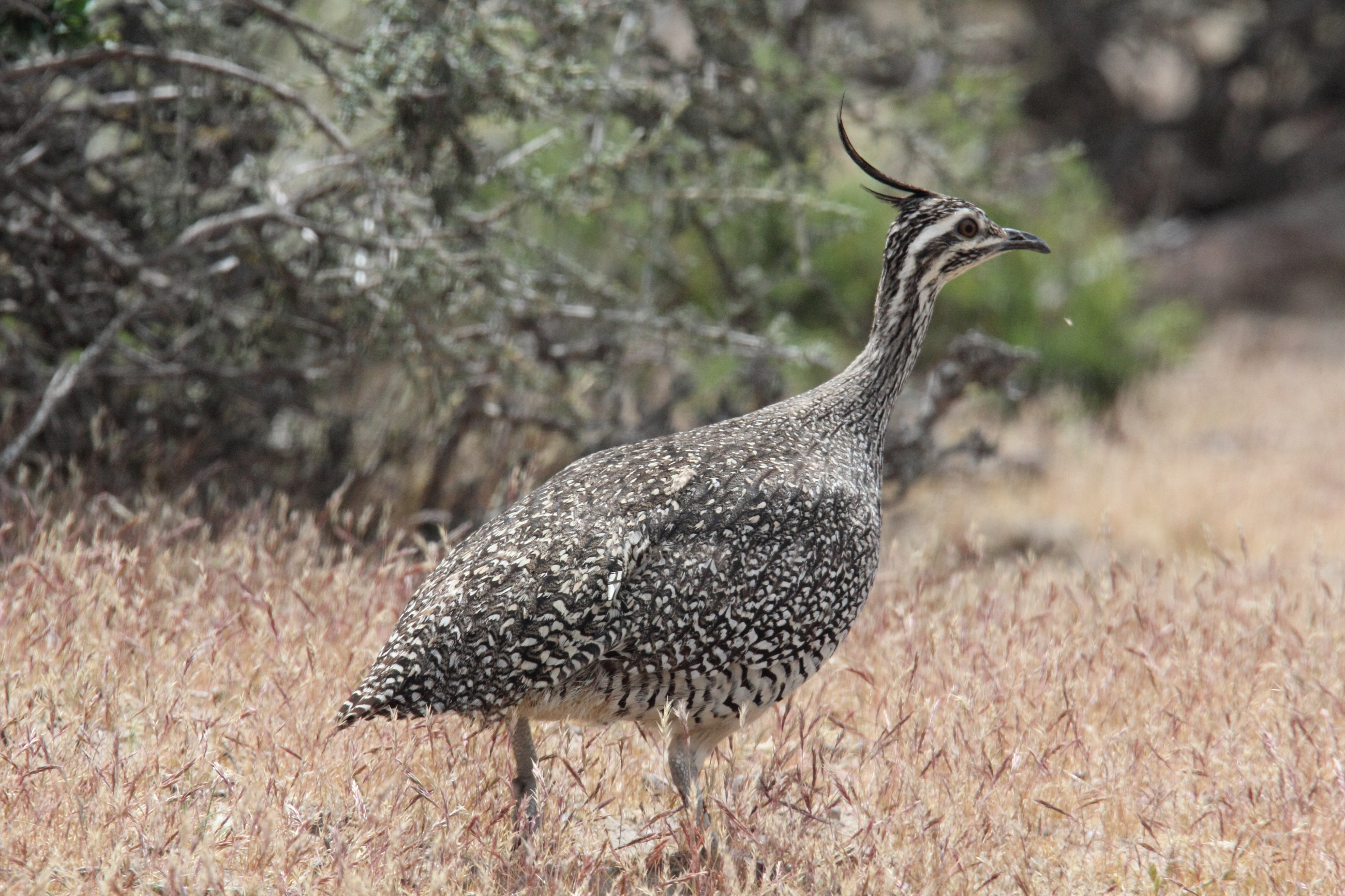
- Elegant crested tinamou (Eudromia elegans)

Scientific classification
- Kingdom: Animalia
- Phylum: Chordata
- Class: Aves
- Infraclass: Palaeognathae
- Clade: Notopalaeognathae
- Clade: Dinocrypturi
- Order: Tinamiformes; Huxley, 1872
- Family: Tinamidae; G.R. Gray, 1840

Type species
- Tinamus major Gmelin, 1789

Genera
- Nothurinae; Eudromia; Nothoprocta; Nothura; Rhynchotus; Taoniscus; Tinamotis; Tinaminae; Crypturellus; Nothocercus; Tinamus

Diversity
- 2 subfamilies, 9 genera, 47 species, 127 subspecies
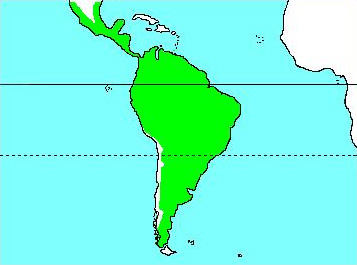
- Range of the family

Synonyms
- Crypturidae Bonaparte, 1831; Tinamotidae Bonaparte, 1854; Eudromiidae Bonaparte, 1854; Rhynchotidae von Boetticher, 1934

= Tinamou =

Tinamous Temporal range: Early Miocene – Recent

Family of birds

Tinamous (/ˈtɪnəmuːz/) are members of the order Tinamiformes (/ˌtɪnəmɪˈfɔːrmiːz/), and family Tinamidae (/tɪˈnæmɪdiː/), divided into two distinct subfamilies, containing 46 species found in Mexico, Central America, and South America. The word "tinamou" comes from the Galibi term for these birds, tinamu. Tinamous are the only living group of palaeognaths able to fly, and were traditionally regarded as the sister group of the flightless ratites, but recent work places them well within the ratite radiation as most closely related to the extinct moa of New Zealand, implying flightlessness emerged among ratites multiple times. Tinamous first appear in the fossil record in the Miocene epoch. They are generally sedentary, ground-dwelling and, though not flightless, when possible avoid flight in favour of hiding or running away from danger. They are found in a variety of habitats, ranging from semi-arid alpine grasslands to tropical rainforests. The two subfamilies are broadly divided by habitat, with the Nothurinae referred to as steppe or open country tinamous, and the Tinaminae known as forest tinamous.

Although some species are quite common, tinamous are shy and secretive birds. They are active during the day, retiring to roosts at night. They generally have cryptic plumage, with males and females similar in appearance, though the females are usually larger. They are opportunistic and omnivorous feeders, consuming a wide variety of plant and animal food from fruits and seeds to worms, insects and small vertebrates. They will dust-bathe as well as wash themselves by standing in heavy rain. They are heard more often than seen, communicating with each other by a variety of frequently given, characteristic calls, especially during the breeding season.

With occasional exceptions, a male tinamou maintains a territory and a nesting site during the breeding season, which a succession of females will visit, laying their eggs in the same nest. Females will wander through several territories, mating with and laying eggs in the nests of the resident males. Nests are always on the ground, concealed in vegetation or among rocks. Eggs are relatively large and glossy, often brightly colored when laid, and are incubated by the males for a period of two to three weeks. The chicks can run soon after hatching and are largely self-sufficient at three weeks old.

Tinamous and their eggs have many natural predators, including falcons, vampire bats, and jaguars. They have also been extensively hunted by humans and sometimes persecuted as agricultural pests. However, the main threat to their populations is from habitat destruction through land clearing and agricultural development. Seven species are listed as vulnerable, and another seven as near-threatened. They feature in the mythology of the indigenous peoples of their range. Often translocated and easily bred in captivity, they have never been successfully domesticated.

== Taxonomy and systematics ==
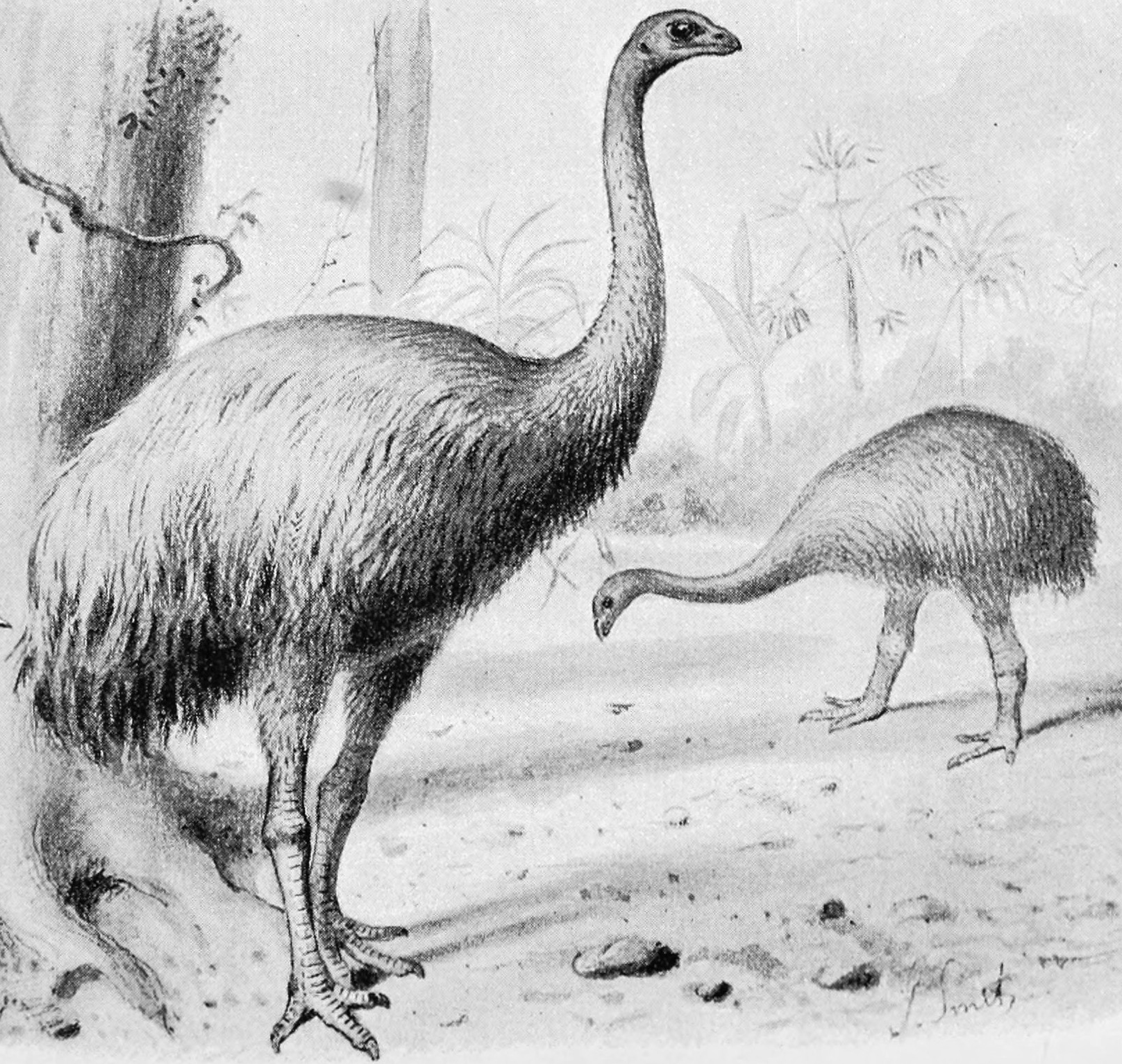
The moas Dinornis robustus and Pachyornis elephantopus, tinamous' extinct ratite cousins from New Zealand

The tinamou family consists of 46 extant species in nine genera. The two subfamilies are the Nothurinae (also known as the Rhyncotinae), the steppe tinamous, and the Tinaminae, the forest tinamous. "Tinamidae" was defined as by Gauthier and de Queiroz (2001): "Tinamidae refers to the crown clade stemming from the most recent common ancestor of Tetrao [Tinamus] major Gmelin 1789 and all extant birds sharing a more recent ancestor with that species than with Struthio camelus Linnaeus 1758 and Vultur gryphus Linnaeus 1758." Their similarity to other ground-dwelling birds such as partridges and megapodes is a result of convergence and symplesiomorphy rather than shared evolutionary innovations.

Of Gondwanan origin, tinamous are allied to the flightless ratites, together comprising the Palaeognathae ("old jaws"), while all other living birds are members of Neognathae ("new jaws"). Unlike other palaeognaths, tinamous do have a keeled sternum, but like the other palaeognaths, they have a distinctive palate. It was formerly believed that the Tinamiformes separated from the ratites early on due to their retention of a keeled sternum. The tinamous' possession of powder-down feathers and preen glands, which the other ratites lack, was another source of confusion in evaluating their taxonomy. The tinamou family has been shown to be monophyletic. Phylogenomic studies have placed it as the sister group to extant Australasian and Oceanian ratites (i.e. the cassowaries, emus, and kiwis), thus putting it well within the ratite phylogenetic tree, with the South American rheas and African ostriches as successive outgroups. Research published starting in 2010 has found that tinamous are closest to the extinct moa of New Zealand; moa are more distantly related to the geographically proximate kiwis, emus and cassowaries than had been previously supposed. These findings imply that flightlessness evolved independently multiple times in ratite evolution. Flight may have been maintained in the tinamou family due to the rhea colonizing South America before ancestral tinamous arrived. The ecological niche for large, flightless herbivores was thus already occupied, forcing tinamous to retain smaller-bodied, omnivorous, and volant lifestyles.

=== Fossil record ===
Flight-capable lithornithids from the Paleocene and Eocene epochs appear to have been structurally the most similar precursors to the tinamous, and may have been ancestral to them as well as to the ratites, though their precise relationships are unclear. The earliest unequivocally Tinamiforme fossil material dates from the Miocene, but flightless ratite-like taxa from the Paleocene may belong to this group.

Several tinamou fossils have been found in the 16–17 Mya Early-Middle Miocene Santa Cruz Formation and the contemporary, or slightly older, Pinturas Formation, in Santa Cruz Province of Argentinian Patagonia, including a tinaminid, Crypturellus reai. Associated fossils indicate that the local palaeoenvironment at the beginning of this period was characterised by a humid, subtropical climate, with forest vegetation, becoming drier and more open with time. Some of the tinamou fossil material appears to be intermediate between the two subfamilies, suggesting that the period coincides with the origins of the radiation of the Nothurinae into the expanding open-country habitats.

Nothurine fossils referrable to Eudromia and Nothura have been found in the Late Miocene Cerro Azul Formation from the Pampean region of central-southern Argentina. Tinamous described from Pliocene material include Eudromia olsoni Tambussi & Tonni, 1985, Nothura parvulus Rovereto, 1914, and Nothura padulosa Mercerat, 1897. The Pliocene fossil genera Cayetornis Brodkorb and Tinamisornis Rovereto have been synonymized with Nothura and Eudromia respectively. Fossils having affinities with several extant genera have been found in Pleistocene deposits.

=== Generic relationships ===
Cladogram of tinamou genera based on a study by Lukas Musher and collaborators published in 2025.

- Tinamidae
  - Tinaminae
    - Nothocercus – 3 species
    - - Tinamus – 5 species
      - Crypturellus – 21 species
  - Nothurinae
    - - Tinamotis – 2 species
      - Eudromia – 2 species
    - - Nothura – 5 species (including dwarf tinamou (Taoniscus nanus))
      - - Rhynchotus – 3 species (including brushland tinamou (Nothoprocta cinerascens))
        - Nothoprocta – 5 species

=== Species in taxonomic order ===
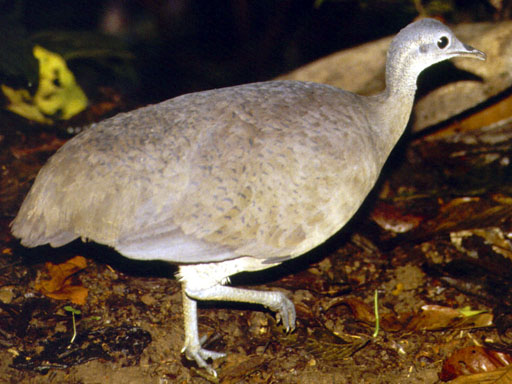
Great tinamou

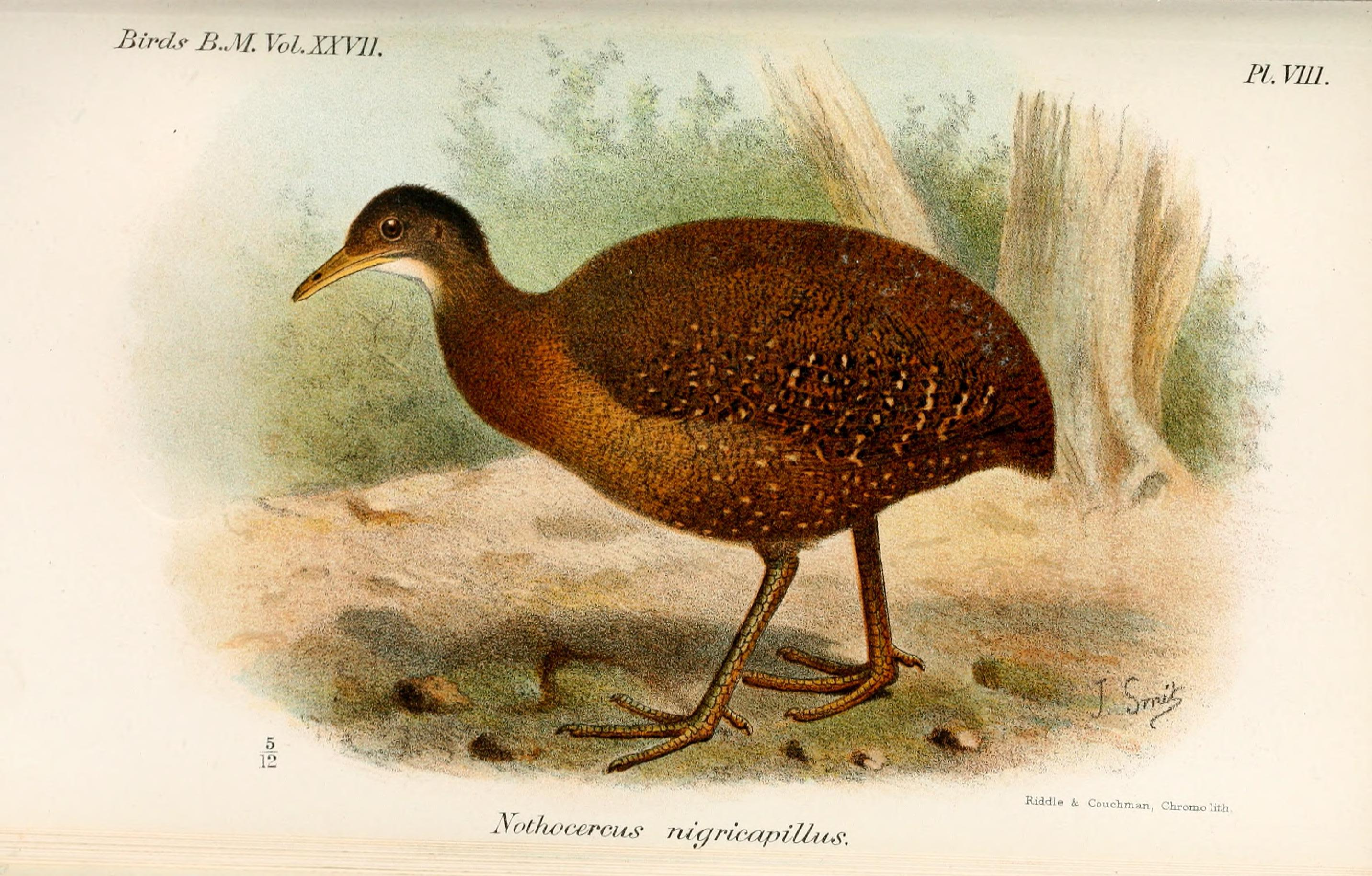
Hooded tinamou

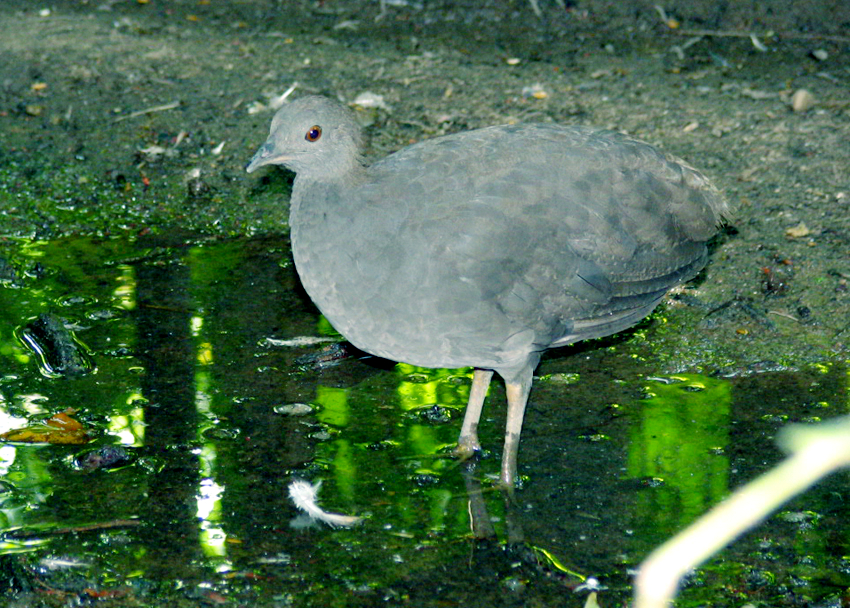
Cinereous tinamou

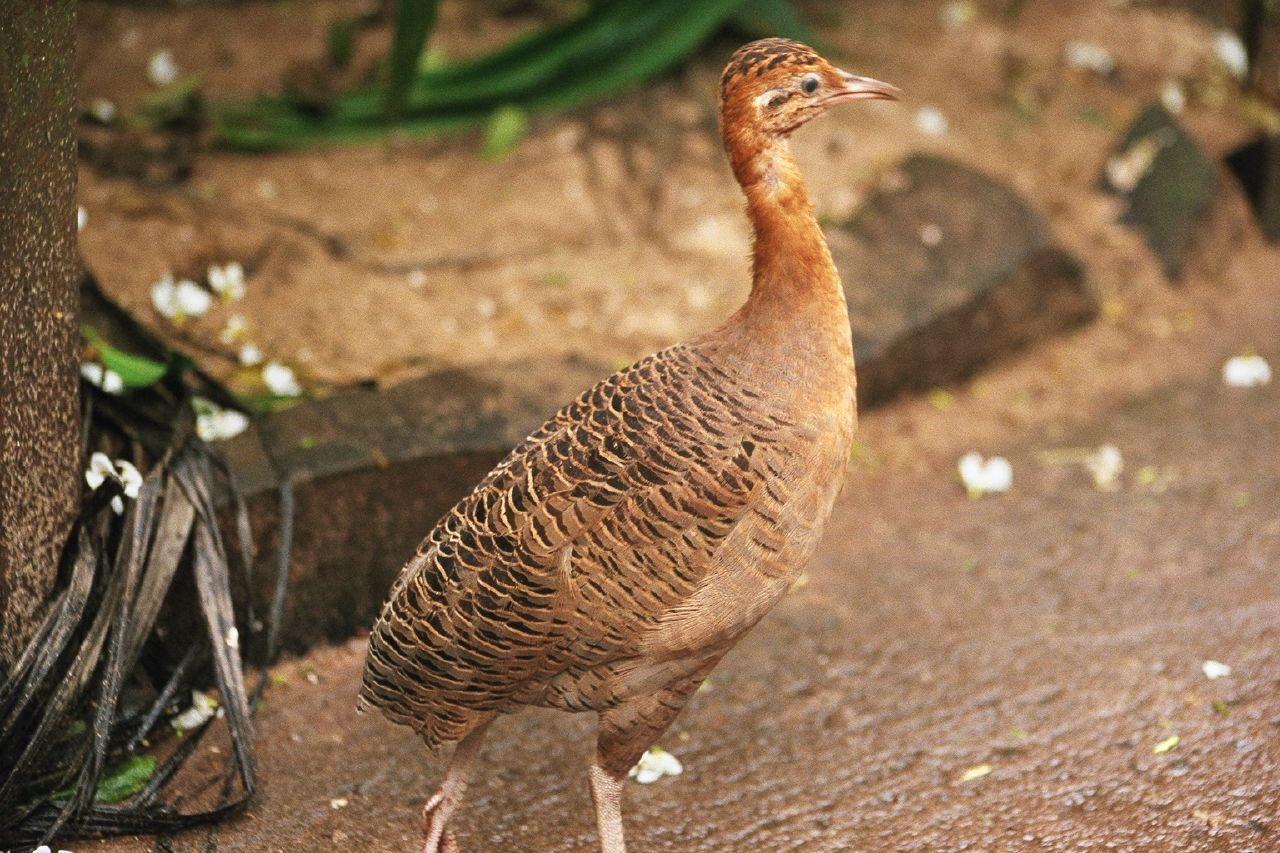
Red-winged tinamou

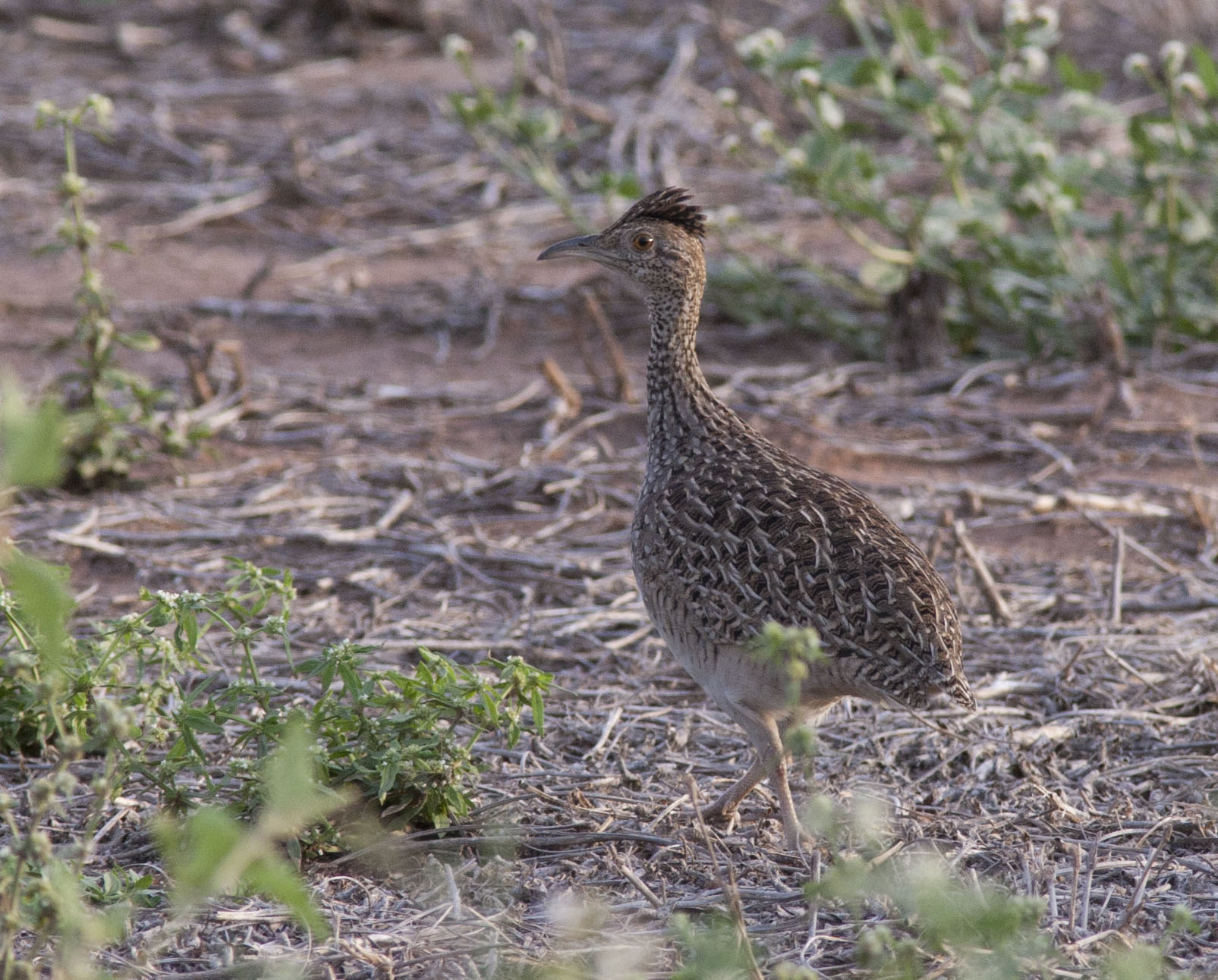
Brushland tinamou

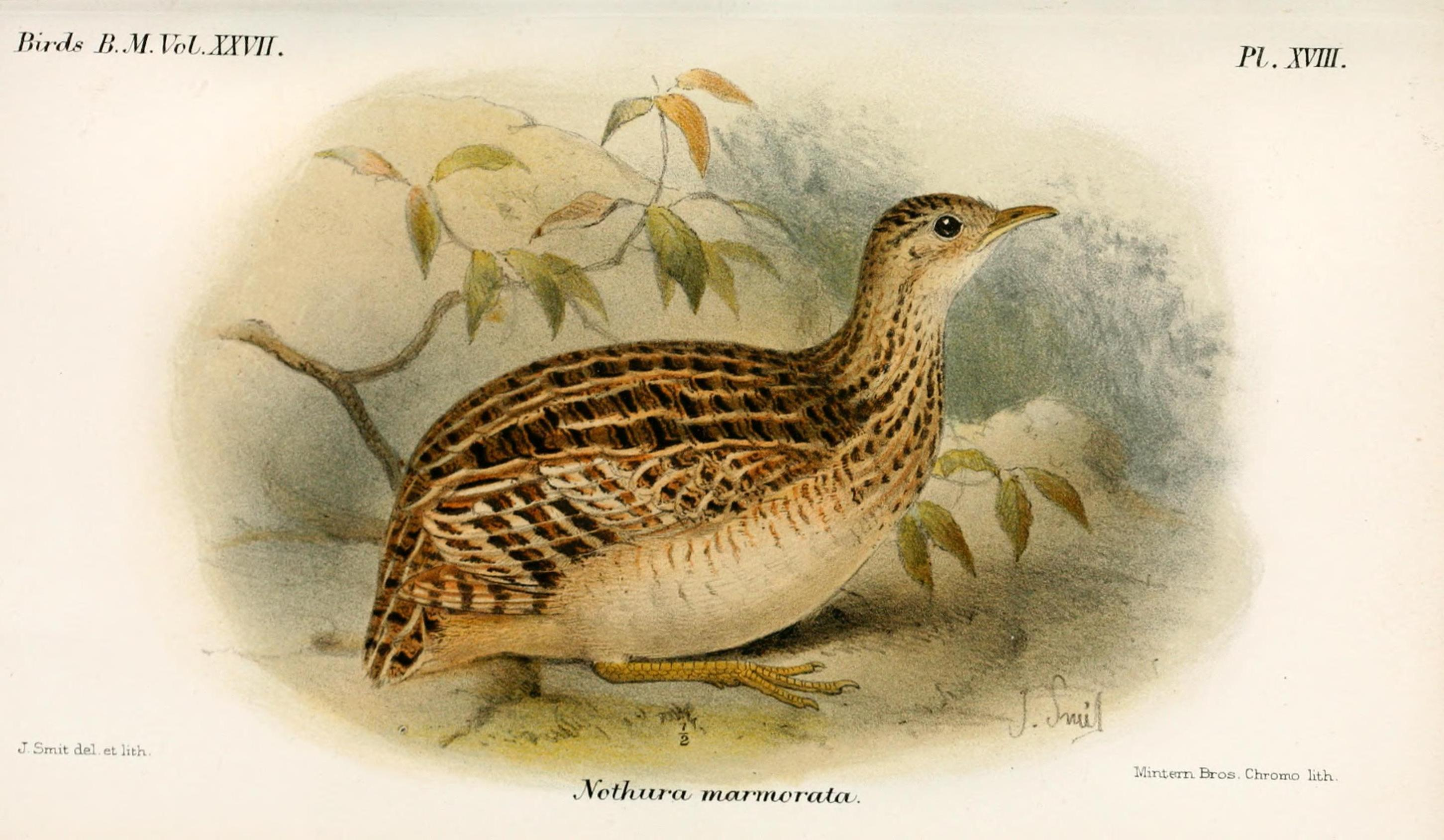
White-bellied nothura

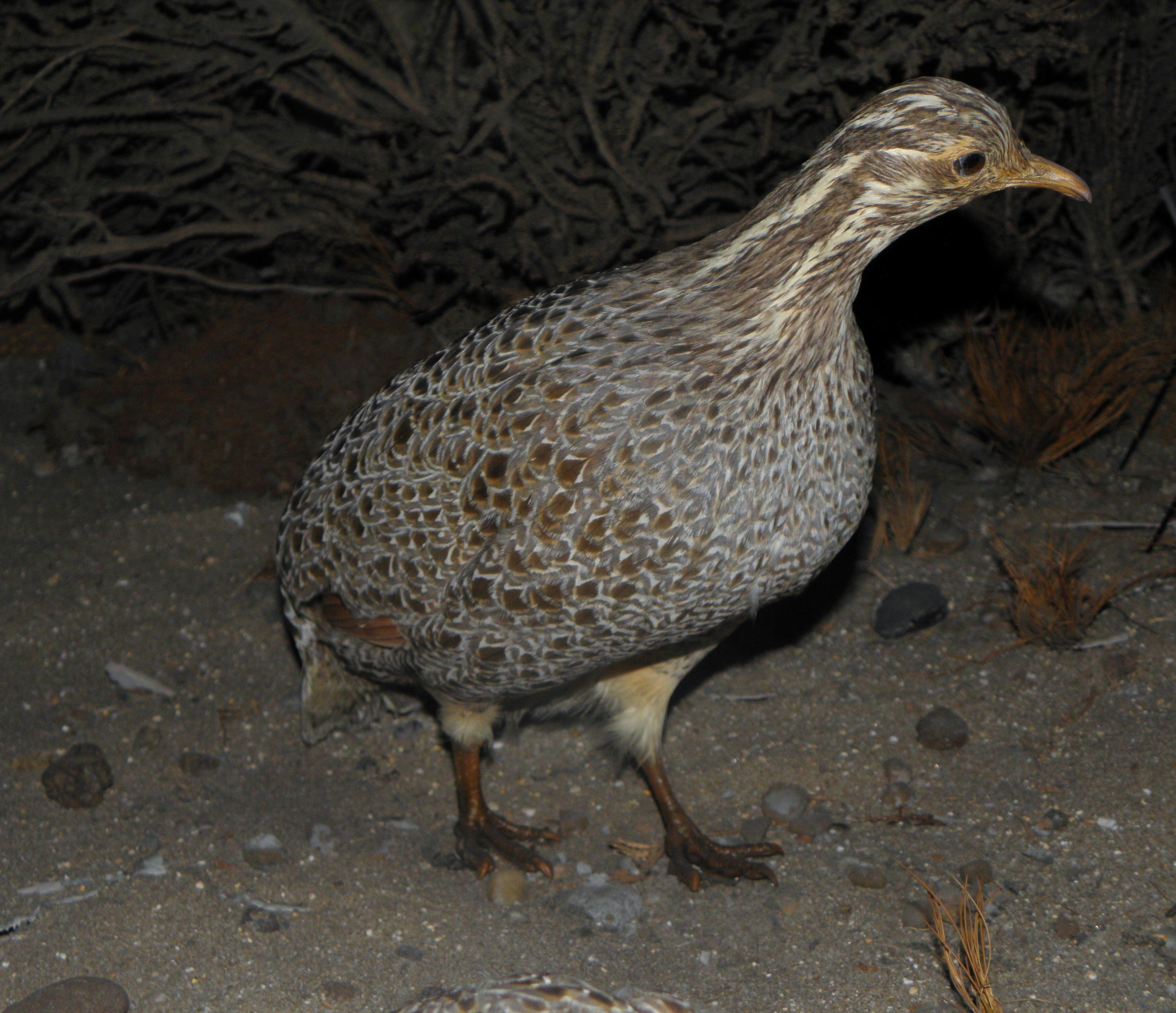
Patagonian tinamou

Conservation status key:

- VU – vulnerable
- NT – near threatened
- LC – least concern
- NE – not evaluated

Order Tinamiformes Huxley 1872 [Crypturi Goodchild 1891; Dromaeomorphae Huxley 1867]
Family Tinamidae

- Genus †Querandiornis Rusconi 1958
  - †Querandiornis romani Rusconi 1958
- Subfamily Tinaminae
  - Genus Crypturellus
    - †Crypturellus reai Chandler 2012
    - Barred tinamou, Crypturellus casiquiare – LC
    - Bartlett's tinamou, Crypturellus bartletti – LC
    - Berlepsch's tinamou, Crypturellus berlepschi – LC
    - Black-capped tinamou, Crypturellus atrocapillus – NT
    - Brazilian tinamou, Crypturellus strigulosus – LC
    - Brown tinamou, Crypturellus obsoletus – LC
    - Choco tinamou, Crypturellus kerriae – VU
    - Cinereous tinamou, Crypturellus cinereus – LC
    - Grey-legged tinamou, Crypturellus duidae – NT
    - Little tinamou, Crypturellus soui – LC
    - Pale-browed tinamou, Crypturellus transfasciatus – NT
    - Red-legged tinamou, Crypturellus erythropus – LC
      - Colombian tinamou, C. (e.) columbianus (taxonomic status presently unclear) SACC in 2006 did not approve the split, BLI followed suit.
      - Magdalena tinamou, C. (e.) saltuarius (taxonomic status presently unclear) SACC in 2006 did not approve the split, BLI followed suit.
      - Santa Marta tinamou, C. (e.) idoneus (taxonomic status presently unclear) SACC in 2006 did not approve the split, BLI followed suit.
    - Rusty tinamou, Crypturellus brevirostris, also known as short-billed tinamou – LC
    - Slaty-breasted tinamou, Crypturellus boucardi, also known as Boucard's tinamou – LC
    - Small-billed tinamou, Crypturellus parvirostris – LC
    - Tataupa tinamou, Crypturellus tataupa – LC
    - Tepui tinamou, Crypturellus ptaritepui – LC
    - Thicket tinamou, Crypturellus cinnamomeus – LC
    - Undulated tinamou, Crypturellus undulatus – LC
    - Variegated tinamou, Crypturellus variegatus – LC
    - Yellow-legged tinamou, Crypturellus noctivagus – NT
  - Genus Nothocercus
    - Highland tinamou, Nothocercus bonapartei – LC
    - Hooded tinamou, Nothocercus nigrocapillus – VU
    - Tawny-breasted tinamou, Nothocercus julius – LC
  - Genus Tinamus
    - Black tinamou, Tinamus osgoodi – VU
    - Great tinamou, Tinamus major – NT
    - Grey tinamou, Tinamus tao – VU
    - Slaty-masked tinamou, Tinamus resonans – NE
    - Solitary tinamou, Tinamus solitarius – NT
    - White-throated tinamou, Tinamus guttatus – NT
- Subfamily Nothurinae
  - Genus Eudromia
    - †Eudromia intermedia (Rovereto 1914) [Tinamisornis intermedius Rovereto 1914 non Dabbene & Lillo 1913; Roveretornis intermedius (Rovereto 1914) Brodkorb 1961]
    - †Eudromia olsoni Tambussi & Tonni 1985 [Tinamisornis intermedius Dabbene & Lillo 1913 non Rovereto 1914; Eudromia elegans intermedia (Dabbene & Lillo 1913)]
    - Elegant crested tinamou, Eudromia elegans – LC
    - Quebracho crested tinamou, Eudromia formosa – LC
  - Genus Nothoprocta
    - Andean tinamou, Nothoprocta pentlandii – LC
    - Brushland tinamou, Nothoprocta cinerascens – LC
    - Chilean tinamou, Nothoprocta perdicaria – LC
    - Curve-billed tinamou, Nothoprocta curvirostris – LC
    - Ornate tinamou, Nothoprocta ornata – LC
    - Taczanowski's tinamou, Nothoprocta taczanowskii – VU
  - Genus Nothura
    - Chaco nothura, Nothura chacoensis – LC
    - Darwin's nothura, Nothura darwinii – LC
    - Lesser nothura, Nothura minor – VU
    - †Nothura paludosa Mercerat 1897
    - †Nothura parvula (Rovereto) Tambussi 1989 [Tinamisornis parvulus Rovereto; Cayetanornis parvulus (Rovereto) Brodkorb 1963]
    - Spotted nothura, Nothura maculosa – LC
    - White-bellied nothura, Nothura boraquira – LC
  - Genus Rhynchotus
    - Huayco tinamou, Rhynchotus maculicollis – LC
    - Red-winged tinamou, Rhynchotus rufescens – LC
  - Genus Taoniscus
    - Dwarf tinamou, Taoniscus nanus, also known as least tinamou – EN
  - Genus Tinamotis
    - Patagonian tinamou, Tinamotis ingoufi, also known as Ingouf's tinamou – LC
    - Puna tinamou, Tinamotis pentlandii, also known as Pentland's tinamou – LC

== Description ==
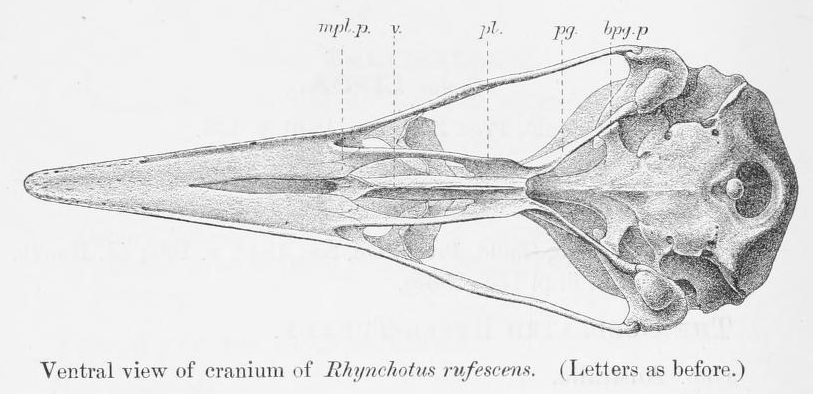
Ventral view of the cranium of a red-winged tinamou

Tinamous are plump, compact birds with slender necks, small heads and, usually, short, decurved bills, though a few have long bills. Females are usually larger than the males. The smallest species, the dwarf tinamou, weighs about 43 g (1.5 oz) with a length of 14.5 cm (5.7 in). Females of the largest, the grey tinamou, weigh up to 2 kg (4.4 lb) with a length of up to 49 cm (19 in). Their feet have three forward-facing toes; a hind toe is either higher and retrogressed, or absent. The back of the tarsus is covered with scales, the color of which may aid in identification.

Tinamous have a pneumaticized skeleton with a sternal keel, 16–18 cervical vertebrae, and fused thoracic vertebrae. They have poor circulation, evidenced by a greenish tint to the skin. They also have relatively the smallest hearts and lungs of all birds, comprising only 1.6–3.1% of their body weight, whereas the equivalent in a domestic chicken is 12%. Despite their poor flying ability, the percentage of their body mass that is muscle is 28.6–40%, which is similar to that of hummingbirds. The preen gland is small and tufted. The male has a corkscrew-shaped penis, similar to those of the other ratites and to the hemipenis of some reptiles. The female has a small phallic organ in the cloaca which becomes larger during the breeding season.

=== Plumage ===
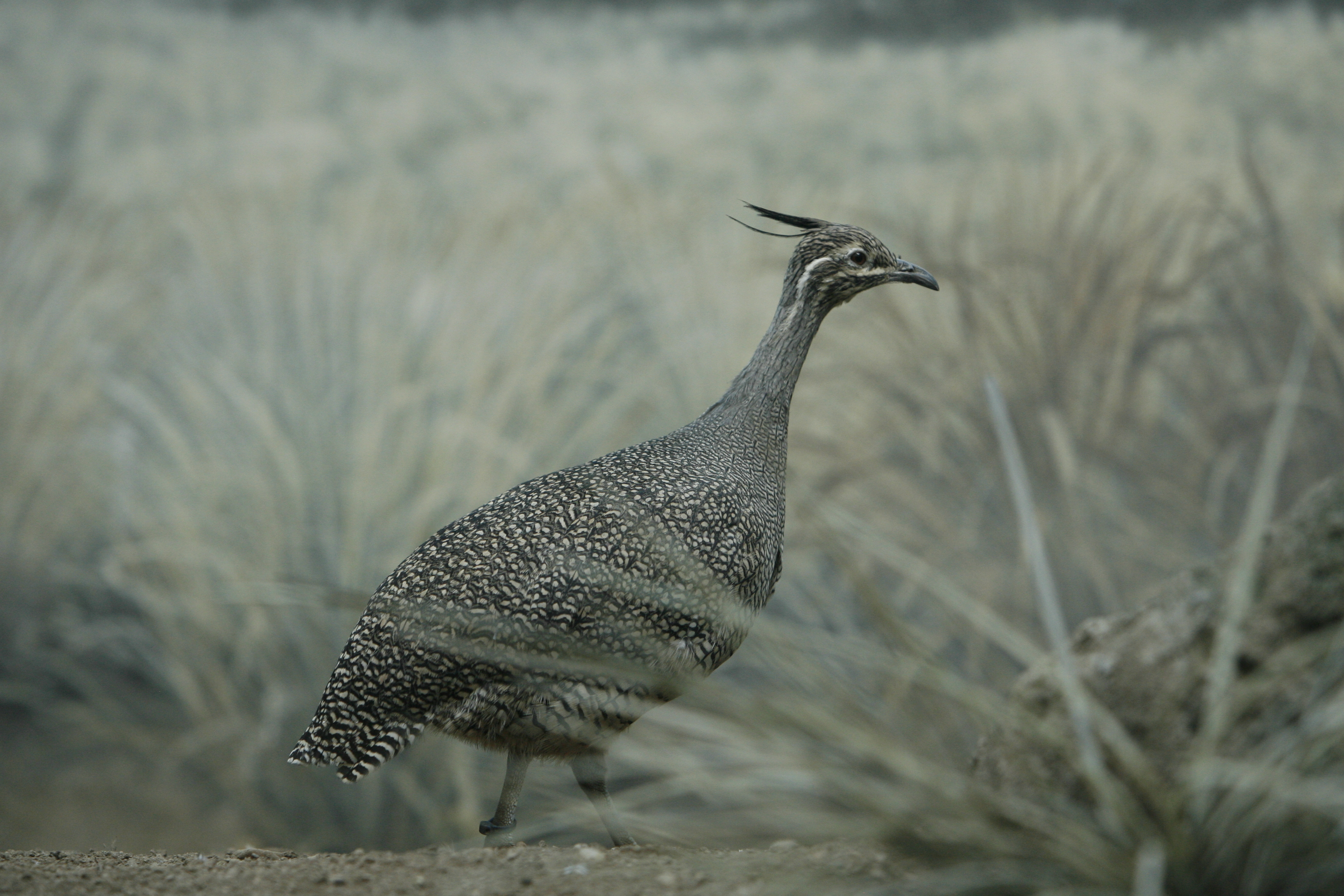
Elegant crested tinamou – one of the crested species

The plumage of the family is cryptic, as is usual with ground birds, with typical colors ranging through dark brown, rufous, buff, yellow and grey. Plumage does not usually differ between sexes, but in a few species, females are brighter. The forest dwellers tend to be darker and more uniform, whereas the steppe species are paler with more barring, speckling, or streaking. Tinamous have well-developed powder down feathers; these grow continuously and disintegrate at the tips into a powder that is spread through the rest of the feathers by preening. This gives the plumage a glossy appearance as well as waterproofing it. Their tails are short, sometimes hidden behind the coverts, and possibly indicative of an ability to sacrifice feathers to a predator in order to escape when grasped. Some tinamous have crests. Members of Eudromia have the most developed crests and, when excited, will direct them forward.

=== Voice ===
Andean tinamou (1m 16s)

Andean tinamou (16s)

Tinamous are rarely seen but often heard within their range and have a wide variety of calls. They are among the most characteristic bird vocalizations of South America and Central America, often resembling sounds made by a flute or a whistle. Some calls are uniform and monotone, while others have multiple phrases. They vary in intensity and can often be heard from afar. Locating a bird by its call is not easy.

Plains-dwelling tinamous have higher-pitched, more delicate voices. They can also be less melodic, sometimes resembling the chirps of crickets. Forest species tend to have deep, loud calls, suitable for penetrating the vegetation. The male highland tinamou can be heard several kilometres distant through dense forest. When calling, a tinamou extends its neck vertically, tilts its head at an angle, and opens its bill wide. A bird, when flushed, will utter a sharp trill.

Identification of tinamous is not an easy task; utilizing their calls as a tool is integral. Each species has its own unique call or calls. The solitary tinamou has 11 different vocalizations. In most species, both sexes call; some have different calls for males and females. Females tend to have deeper voices. Some species, in particular members of Crypturellus, have regional dialects. Male slaty-breasted tinamous have calls unique enough to be individually recognized by humans.

Calls are typically heard more frequently during the breeding season. However, the time of day can differ amongst species, as some are more vocal in the morning, others in the evening, and some are more vocal during the heat of midday. Some will call at night from their roosts. Frequency can vary between species and between individuals. One male brushland tinamou called every few minutes from dawn until dusk (over 500 calls daily). Some, in particular Crypturellus species, use regular call sites. Only a few possess an alarm call.

== Distribution and habitat ==
=== Range ===
Tinamous are exclusively neotropical and all 47 species live in South America, Mexico, and Central America. The range of the northernmost species extends to Mexico but not much further north than the Tropic of Cancer. Chilean tinamous have been introduced to Easter Island. The greatest concentration of species is in the tropics, and in particular the Amazon Basin. In the north, they tend to be forest or woodland birds, while in the south they prefer open habitats. Tinamous form the dominant group of terrestrial birds in South America, where they largely replace the Galliformes ecologically, with no other bird family there having comparable diversity, distribution, or suite of habitat adaptations. Rheas are only found in open country, curassows and guans are generally limited to forests, and the pheasant family is only represented by a few species in the north of the region.

They occur in a wide range of habitats. Members of the genera Tinamus, Nothocercus, and Crypturellus live in dense forests, with Nothocercus preferring high altitude, and members of most other genera in grassland, puna, montane forest, and savanna. Tinamotis and Nothoprocta prefer high altitude habitats, up to 5,000 m (16,000 ft), whereas the other steppe tinamous have a wide altitude range. Tinamous inhabit most parts of South and Central America, as well as the tropical regions of Mexico, with the exception of aquatic, snow-covered, and true desert habitats, and the southernmost tip of Patagonia.

=== Ecology ===
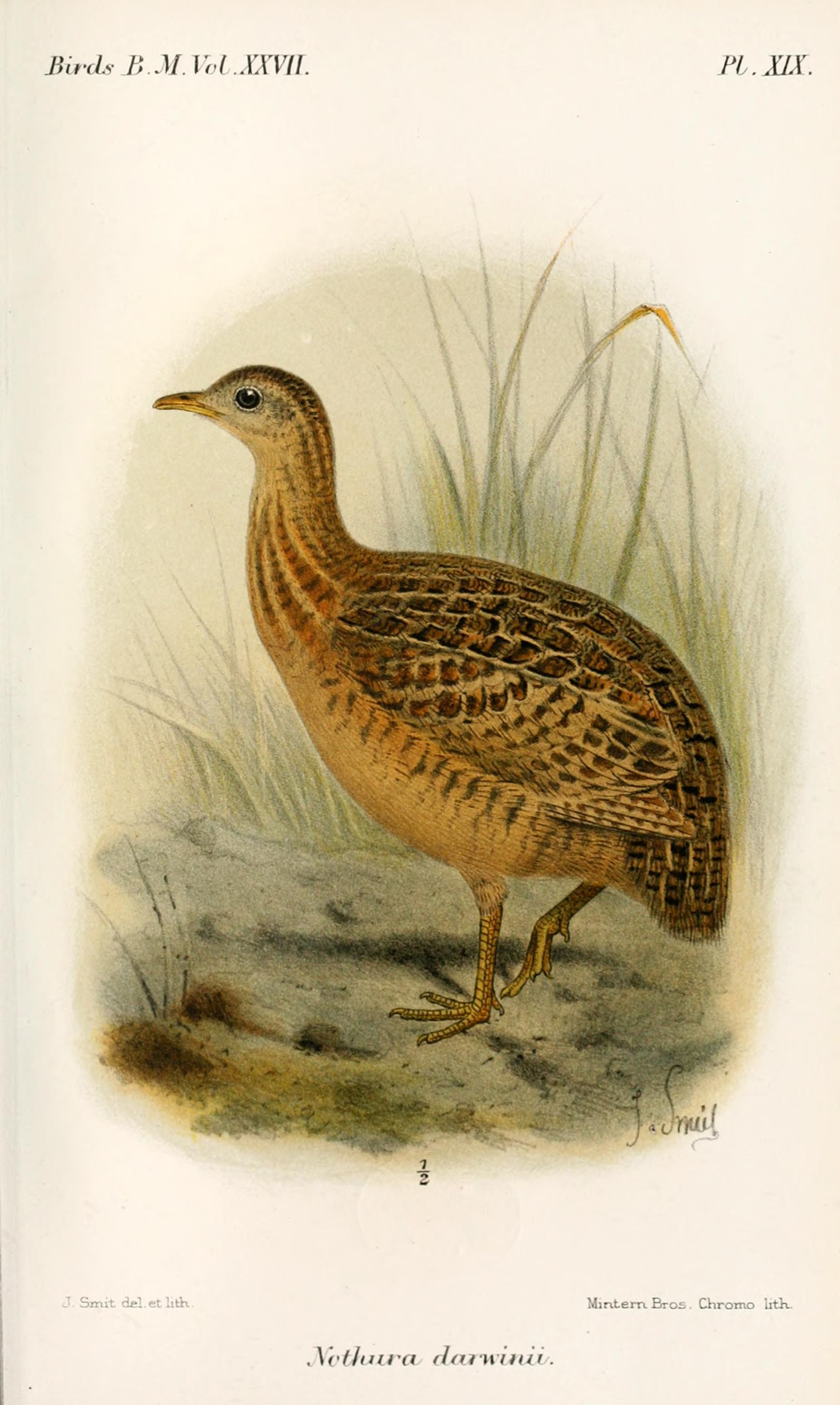
Darwin's nothura occupies high altitude grasslands

Behavioral and ecological separation of tinamou species is evident where their ranges overlap through the utilization of different food sources and occupation of limited micro-habitats. These micro-habitats are not always easy to identify and are highly vulnerable to environmental changes. Some species, such as the red-winged tinamou, utilize multiple habitats such as the open savannas of Amazonia and the dry valleys of the Andes. Similarly, brown tinamous occur in both the Amazon basin and the humid montane forests on the Andean slope.

Panama provides examples of ecological separation. The highland tinamou occupies the highlands throughout the country. The great tinamou prefers the rainforests on the slopes. The Choco tinamou also likes the rainforest, but is limited to the southeast of the country. Finally, the little tinamou is found in dense secondary forest on either the Pacific or Atlantic slope above 1,000 m (3,300 ft). Size difference allows the red-winged tinamou and the spotted nothura to coexist, as they both occupy the same habitat of Brazil, the tropical savanna. The former prefers long grass pastures, while the latter prefers short grass.

Further examples of such diversity are found in the Andes, where a small subspecies of Darwin's nothura, Nothura darwinii boliviana, occurs in grassland at about 2,000 m (6,600 ft) above sea level. Here also are the red-winged tinamou, which prefers open ground with some scrub, and the Andean tinamou, which prefers dense vegetation beside streams. Their habitat extends upslope through the Polylepis woodlands into puna grassland. In the puna is another subspecies of Darwin's nothura, Nothura darwinii agassizii, which prefers tussock grassland. Also in the puna is the ornate tinamou, which frequents the rocky slopes and cliffs of tola heath. Higher in the puna is the puna tinamou, living just below the snowline at 5,300 m (17,400 ft) as well as in the semi-deserts of the southern Altiplano.

=== Movements ===
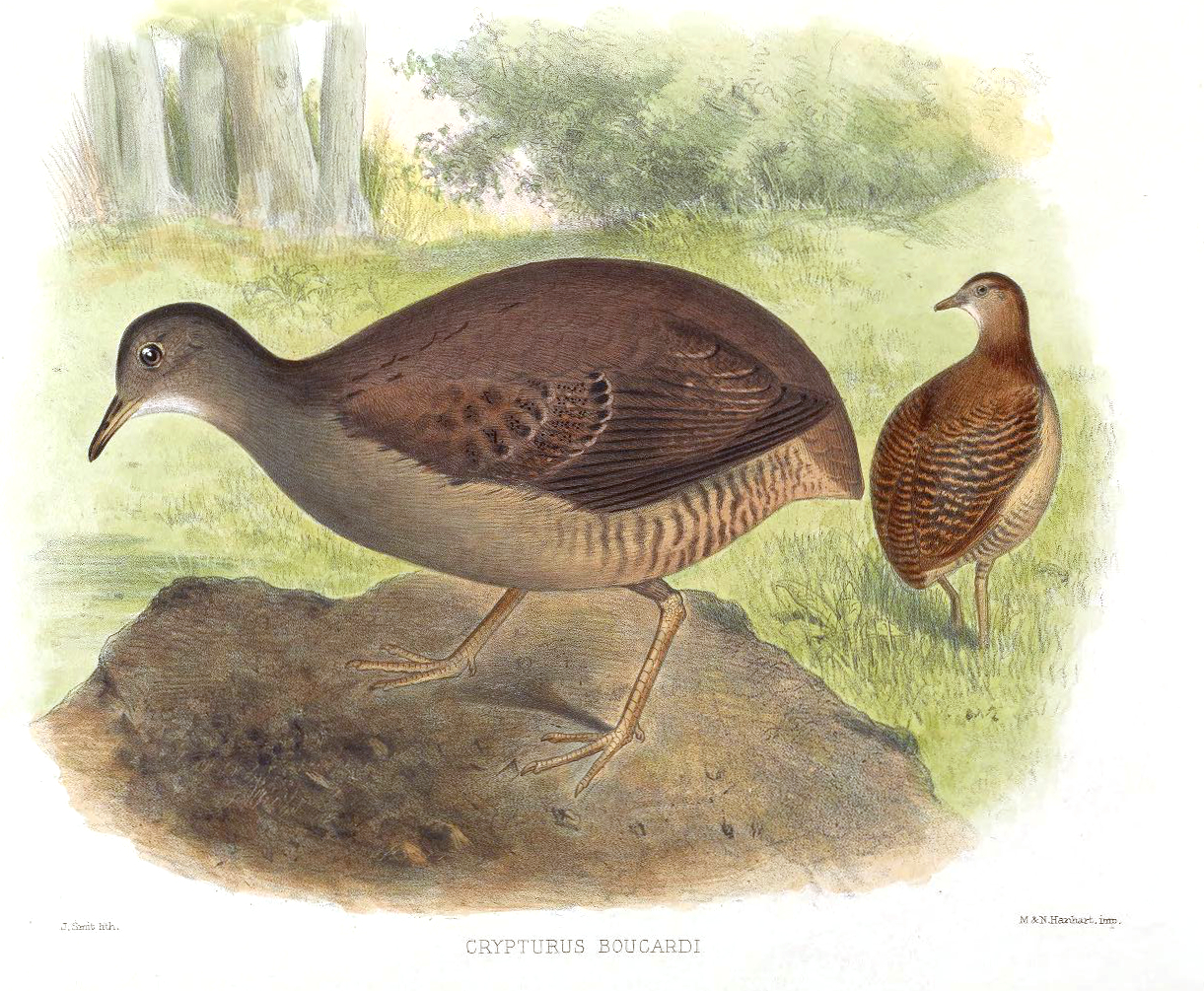
Slaty-breasted tinamous are found in tropical lowland forests

Tinamous are largely sedentary birds. Forest-dwelling tinamous will move short distances if climatic conditions, such as intense rain, flooding or drought, force them to. Most Amazonian species will move between the varzea forests and dry land depending on water levels. The puna tinamou occupies high ridges in the Andes but, in bad weather, will move down to the valley floors.

Forest species, such as the slaty-breasted tinamou, maintain large home ranges through which they move in apparently random patterns. The male brushland tinamou maintains a home territory of 20 ha (49 acres), but will occasionally wander outside it into those of his neighbors. Females will wander throughout multiple males' territories. The ornate tinamou lives mainly upslope in hilly puna grassland but will move each morning to the bottom of the slopes to feed and drink. Granivorous species will move daily into grain fields with some, such as Darwin's nothura, remaining in the fields until there is no food left. Open country and southern species maintain territories only during the breeding season and at other times seem to wander at random.

== Behavior ==
Tinamous form one of the most terrestrial groups of flying birds, spending virtually all of their time on the ground. They walk silently, pausing frequently in mid-stride. When a potential threat is detected, a tinamou will typically freeze in one of two positions, either crouched or with its neck extended upwards. As far as possible, they will avoid resorting to flight by stealthy walking or running away from danger as well as by concealment in dense vegetation. They may then pause to observe the cause of their alarm from cover. They also hide in burrows. Their cryptic behavior has allowed them to survive or even thrive in areas where guans have been extirpated.

=== Flight ===
Unlike the related ratites, tinamous can fly, though poorly and reluctantly, preferring to walk or run. When forced to take to the air, they do so only for short distances at high speed. Their small wings give them a high wing loading. They take off with rapid and noisy wing beats until they have gained sufficient altitude, then glide while slipping sideways, with an occasional further burst of flapping. Due to their near lack of a tail to serve as a rudder or counterweight, tinamous are notoriously poor at steering. They regularly crash into objects on attempting to take off, sometimes with fatal consequences. They rarely fly more than 150 m (490 ft) and typically do so downslope where the terrain allows. They land in an upright position with an upstretched neck. Some species will land running. The brushland tinamou will perform a sharp 90° turn immediately before touching down.

=== Roosting ===
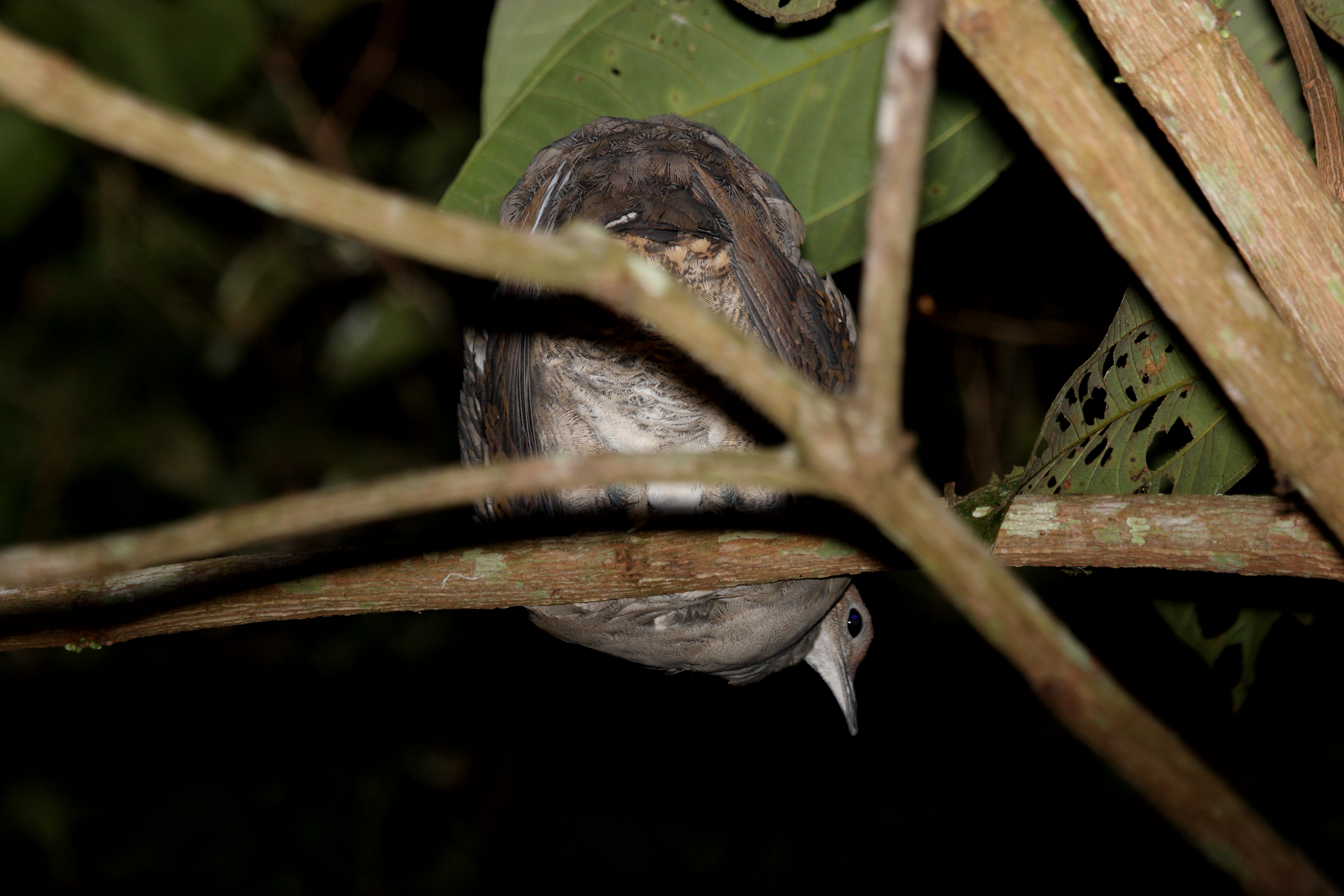
Many of the larger tinamous, like this great tinamou, roost in trees at night.

Although tinamous are diurnal, many species become less active in the middle of the day. They rest or feed during this period, while during the night they will cease all activity. They are wary of the dark; they roost at night and have been known to roost during solar eclipses. Roosting of the larger forest species, such as those in Tinamus, occurs in trees. They prefer horizontal branches approximately 2–5 m (6.6–16.4 ft) off the ground, choosing sites with good views and clear exits. In order to minimize the effort involved in ascending to their roosts, in hilly terrain, they will access them from uphill and, when threatened, will fly downhill to gain more distance from the threat.

Tinamous prefer thick branches on which to roost as they do not clutch the branch with their toes, but rest on it with folded legs. They will reuse the same locations and avoid defecating nearby to avoid advertising the roost site to predators. The smaller forest species, along with the steppe tinamous, will roost on the ground, sometimes in the shelter of a bush. They will also use the same location repeatedly; known examples are the elegant crested and ornate tinamous.

=== Sociality ===
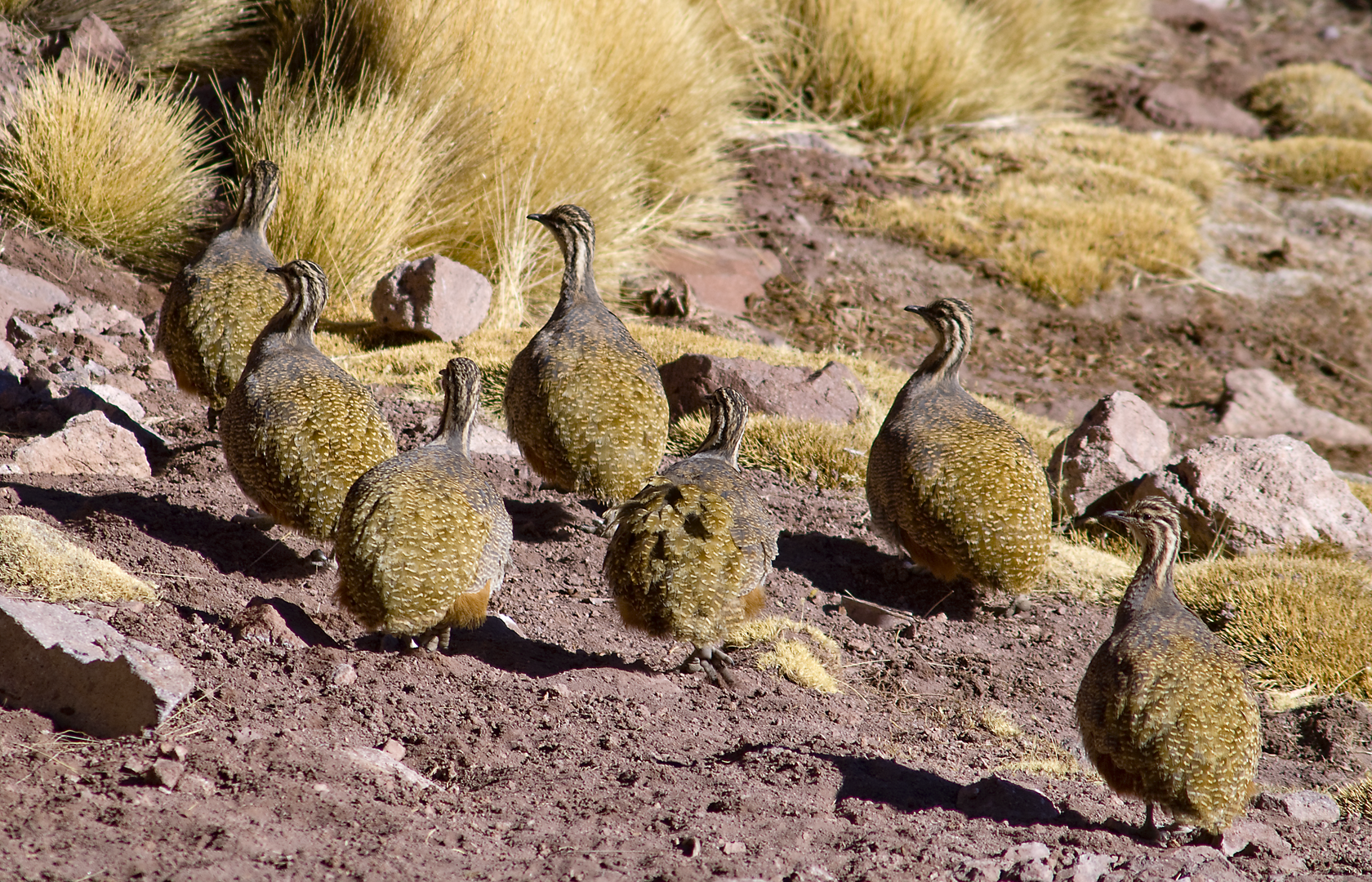
Puna tinamou group

Tinamous, depending on the species, may be solitary or social and gather in groups. Gregariousness also varies by season. Forest species tend to be solitary and may only approach other birds during the breeding season. Some live as mated pairs throughout the year. Steppe or grassland species tend to live in groups, though with little obvious group interaction apart from an occasional contact call. Group size may vary by season; in winter, aggregations of elegant crested tinamous may approach 100 birds.

Both steppe and forest species are territorial, though territoriality varies between species from being characteristic only during the breeding season to being territorial throughout the year. When defending their territories from conspecifics, tinamous are highly vocal, creating a cacophony. When an intruder is noticed, birds of the same sex will confront it. This may lead to conflict, with feet and wings being used in attack. Both males and females will defend their territories; however, in each species, only one sex is fiercely territorial.

== Breeding ==
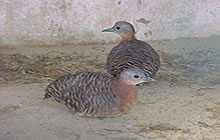
The variegated tinamou has an asymmetrical sex ratio, with more females than males

In most tinamou species, the males practice simultaneous polygyny and the females sequential polyandry. This is not invariable; ornate tinamous form stable pairs, and spotted nothuras are monogamous when young and polygamous when older. There are sometimes larger numbers of males than females; for example, the variegated tinamou can have a male to female ratio of up to 4:1.

The breeding season varies from species to species; those that live in tropical forests, where there is little seasonal change, may breed at any time, though there is usually a preferred period. In areas with marked seasonal fluctuations, tinamous generally breed when food is most abundant, typically during the summer. Studies have shown that it is not day length that determines the onset of breeding, but the amount of light, through cloud cover.

=== Courtship ===
The courtship process starts with the male vocally advertising his abilities with continuous calling. He will try to attract multiple females. In Tinamus species, the male will lower his chest to the ground, stretch his neck forward, and fluff up his back to appear larger than normal. When observed head on, all of the bird's back is in view while the under-tail coverts are exposed, a pose similar to that used by the rhea. The female will scratch her feet on the ground as part of the ritual.

=== Nesting ===
Tinamous always nest on the ground; in open areas, near a bush; in scrub, in a dense patch of grass; in forest, at the base of a tree trunk between the buttresses. The highland tinamou is unique in that it sites its nest in a cavity or under an overhanging rock on a steep slope. Many species do not build a nest, choosing to lay their eggs on a thin bed of leaves. Other species construct nests and are meticulous in doing so. The nest of the ornate tinamou is circular and made of grass on a turf surface. The male brushland tinamou starts to scrape out a nest once copulation has occurred; several may be constructed, though only one is used.

=== Egg-laying ===
Egg colors

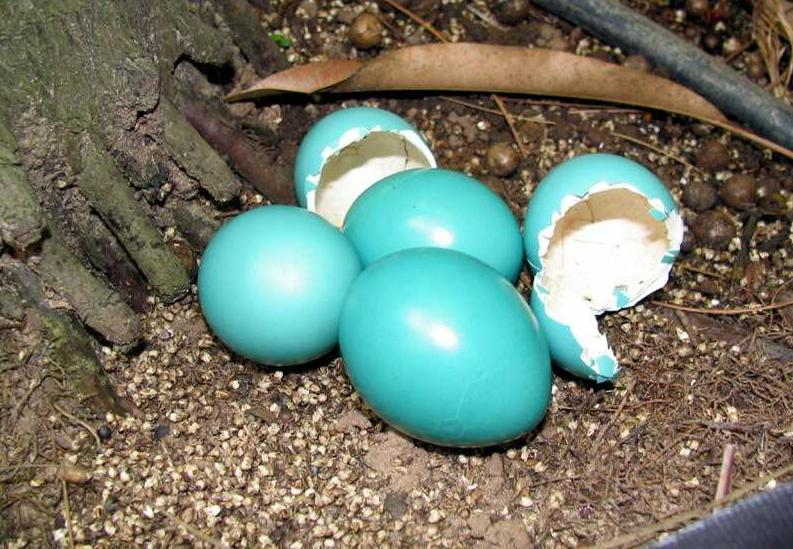
Eggs of the white-throated tinamou.

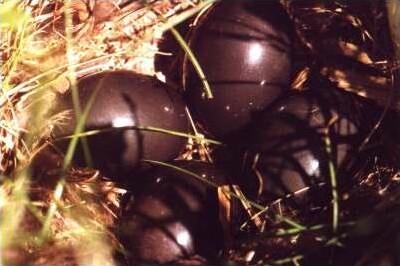
Eggs of the spotted nothura.

A tinamou female lays several eggs which the male incubates while the female departs to seek another mate. Large species will lay one egg every 3–4 days, while the smaller ones lay on consecutive days. The females lay eggs in multiple nests throughout the nesting season.

There may be as many as 16 eggs in a clutch, a consequence of several females laying in the same nest. The more mature male will attract more females and may have the eggs of up to four females under him. The variegated and ornate tinamous have single-female nests, and consequently only one or two eggs per nest. This may result from food shortage in their ranges and the consequent ability to care for only one or two chicks.

The eggs are fairly deeply colored, usually in a single color, and have a hard porcelain-like gloss. Colors vary with species, ranging through green, purple, violet, turquoise, steel grey, chocolate and lemon-yellow. White is rare, but does occur. Though the eggs are bright and colorful when laid, over time, they fade and become duller. For example, the egg of the red-winged tinamou dulls from purple to leaden. Most tinamou eggs are solid colored, without spots or speckling; however, the eggs of Tinamotis species may exhibit small white speckles. The benefit of laying brightly colored eggs is unknown, but is not detrimental as most tinamou predators hunt at night.

Eggs are relatively large compared to the mass of the female, though even the largest birds produce eggs very similar in size to the smallest of species. Their shapes are either spherical or elliptical; the two ends are similar in shape and difficult to distinguish. The shells are thin enough to see the embryos within.

=== Incubation ===
Incubation takes about 16 days in Crypturellus, which contains the smallest species, and 19–20 days in Tinamus and Eudromia. During this period, the male is typically silent; if he does call, he does so away from the nest. As he incubates, he will leave the nest to feed, and he may be gone from 45 minutes to five hours, covering the eggs when he leaves. While incubating, he is mainly motionless and reluctant to move, even from potential danger. It is possible for a human observer to approach and touch the incubating male without eliciting an overt response. Some species will flatten themselves against the ground, stretch out their necks, and raise their backs to the air. This posture causes them to resemble a plant; however, if it is overdone, the eggs become visible from behind.

If the male becomes alarmed enough to leave the nest, he will attempt a distraction display. This usually involves a fake injury display, similar to that of the killdeer. To do this, he will hop on one leg and attempt to fly, always falling down. He will perform this display if the eggs have not hatched or the chicks are still too young to fly. It is generally believed that tinamous are not as effective at distraction displays as other birds.

=== Chicks ===
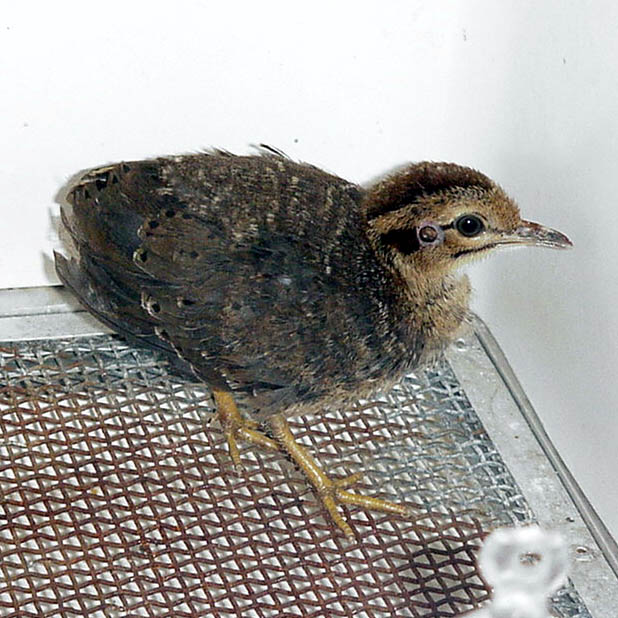
Juvenile undulated tinamou in captivity

Chicks hatch synchronously with a dense downy coat. The coloring is white, grey or yellow, with dark spots to aid in camouflage. The young are precocial, and can run almost as soon as they hatch. Soon after hatching the eggs, the male will leave the nest and call the chicks to him with a soft contact call. If threatened, he will freeze and attempt to hide the chicks under his wings or belly. There have been documented cases of females caring for the young; it is thought that this occurs when the male has been killed. Young chicks can feed themselves within the first few days, but the male will bring the food and drop it on the ground in front of them. The chicks have a high initial mortality rate. However, within a few days, they are chasing insects on their own and, at 1–3 weeks, they can fly to branches a metre from the ground. They are self-sufficient within 20 days.

By 20 days, the young slaty-breasted tinamou has gained adult size, though not adult weight. The spotted nothura will go from 10% of adult weight to 90% within 85 days, and the red-winged tinamou will do so in 108 days. Sexual maturity comes at the age of one year, although some species may be physiologically mature by 57 days. However, some behavior may need to be learned before the birds can breed successfully.

Once done with the brood, the male, if still within the breeding season, will seek out another female and initiate the cycle again. Studies have shown that 54–62% of breeding female spotted nothura are first-year birds.

== Feeding ==
=== Foods ===
Tinamous are opportunistic feeders and eat a wide range of foods, though each species varies in proportional dietary makeup. Tinamou genera can be roughly divided into three groups based on the vegetable component of their diets. Tinamus, Nothocercus and Crypturellus focus on fleshy fruit. Nothura, Nothoprocta and Eudromia, comprising open country birds, eat mainly seeds and other soft vegetative matter. High-altitude genera living in harsh environments, such as Tinamotis, will eat most of the plant, not just the succulent parts.

Most species eat a mixture of plant and animal products, though some are mainly herbivorous and others predominantly insectivorous or carnivorous. Diet may also vary seasonally; red-winged tinamous eat mostly animal food in the summer and plant matter in the winter. Chicks eat more insects than their parents, probably to meet their growth needs.

Consumed plant material includes fruit (either fallen or on the tree), seeds, green shoots, tender leaves, buds, flowers, tender stems, roots, and tubers. Much of the animal food consists of insects, including ants, termites, beetles, grasshoppers, Hemiptera, and lepidopteran larvae, as well as gastropods, mollusks, worms, and small vertebrates, such as amphibians and reptiles. Larger species will eat small mammals.

=== Feeding methods ===
Food is primarily obtained from the ground, but also from the vine. The birds may jump for fruit or, as with the Crypturellus species, jump up to a metre in height for insects. The main foraging technique is a slow walk with head down, pecking at the ground and looking up occasionally. Small animals are eaten whole, larger ones are beaten against the ground or pecked. Bills rather than feet are used to probe leaf litter and sift through soil 2 to 3 cm (0.8–1.2 in) deep.

The most frequent diggers are Rhynchotus, Nothura and Nothoprocta species, which are open country birds. They have their nostrils positioned at the base of the bills, a feature thought to be an adaptation to their digging. As with most birds, they swallow grit to aid their gizzards in digestion. Some species follow army ants, eating from the disturbance created. Others feed in the company of antbirds, formicariids, and ovenbirds. Nothura species, in particular, will follow livestock and eat the ticks that fall off them as well as the insects knocked off bushes as they pass.

=== Drinking ===
Water is required by most tinamou species, with some needing a good source within their home territory. Solitary tinamous can withstand an extended period without water by eating more succulent plants. However, species that live in arid or semi-arid climates rarely need any additional water beyond that ingested with their diet. When tinamous drink, unlike most other birds, they do so by sucking and swallowing, instead of lifting their heads and letting gravity do the work.

== Health and mortality ==
=== Hygiene ===
Tinamous are avid bathers. During heavy rain, they may stand erect with their bill pointing skyward, allowing the rain to wash over them. They will dust-bathe at regular intervals, and have been known to dust-bathe often enough to tint themselves the same color as the soil. They also sunbathe, and will do so while resting on one leg with an outstretched wing. Defecation for a tinamou is a slightly involved task as it must move aside the dense plumage that surrounds the cloaca to avoid soiling itself. Captive tinamous defecate once daily.

=== Parasites ===
There are over 240 species of bird lice that infest tinamous, with one individual bird recorded as hosting nine species. Blood parasites include louse flies, leeches, nematodes, cestodes, armadillo ticks, mites, and trematodes. Darwin's nothura may carry a malarial plasmodium.

=== Predators ===
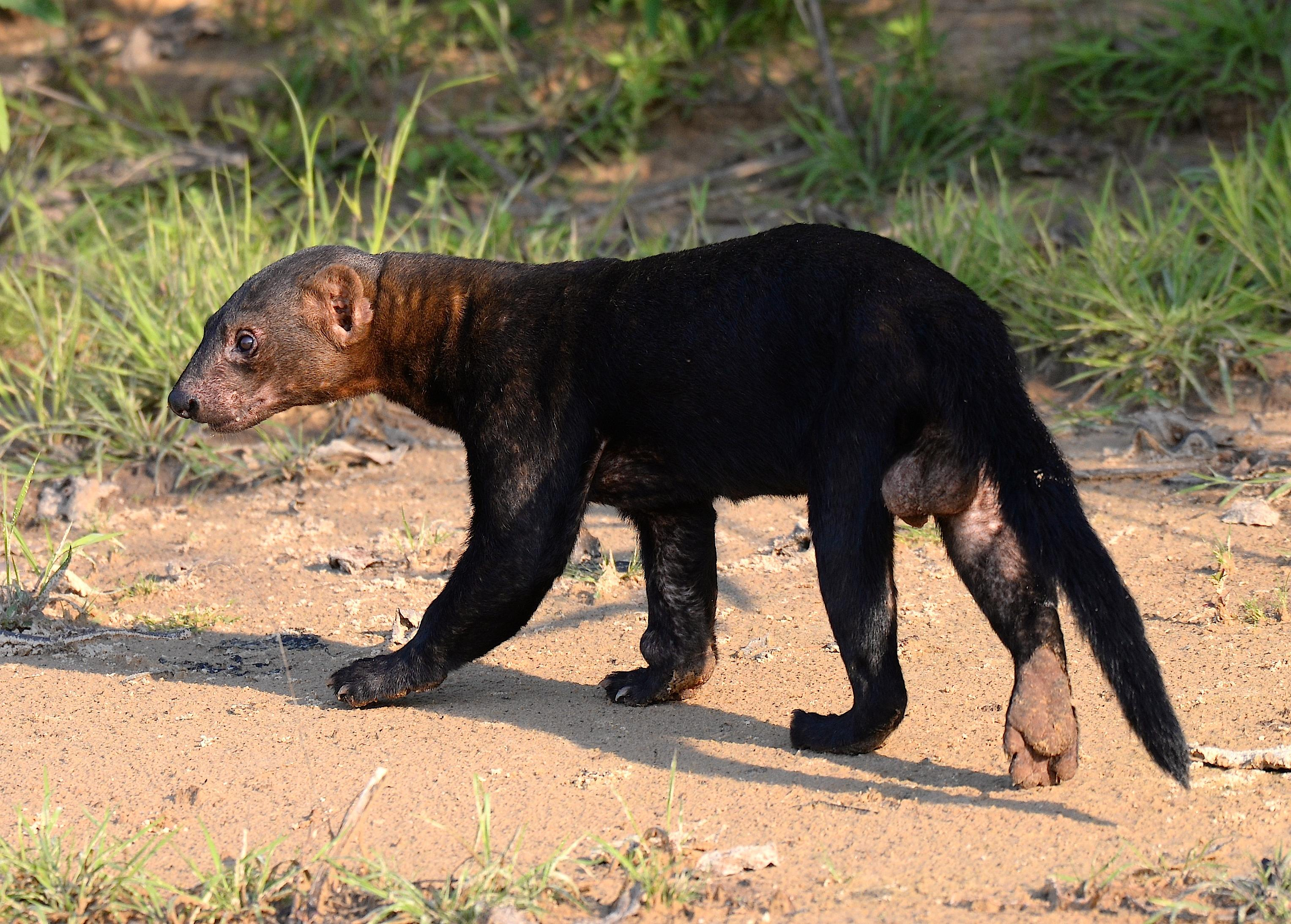
Tayras prey on tropical forest tinamous.

Tinamou predators include cats, foxes, raccoons, skunks, weasels, tayras, rats, peccaries, and opossums. Legend speaks of jaguars that imitate the call to trick and catch them. Nests are vulnerable to snakes, monkeys and opossums. Giant anteaters have been seen on Marajo Island breaking tinamou eggs. Forest falcons and orange-breasted falcons have been seen hunting them, and vampire bats lap their blood.

== Relationship with humans ==
=== Mythology ===
Tinamous have established themselves in the folklore and histories of the indigenous people of South America and Central America. Forest tribes of Brazil and Colombia believe the jaguar imitates the call of the great tinamou in order to track and eat it. A tale from the Guahibo Indians tells of a young man traveling by canoe who tried to locate a calling tinamou. As he approached the bank, he became suspicious of the harshness of the call and backed away just as a jaguar burst out of the vegetation.

Panamanian tradition states that after the "Great Flood", the great tinamou grew frightened of the bright colors in the rainbow. He flew away from the rainbow, the ark, and the rest of the animals, heading for the darkest part of the forest, where he has remained ever since.

A Brazilian legend explains the separation of the red-winged tinamou and the undulated tinamou. The story starts off with how inseparable the two birds were, as they did everything together. One day, they got into an argument and split up. The undulated tinamou went into the deepest dark of the forest, and the red-winged tinamou, wanting to be different, went to the grassy plains. One day, the undulated tinamou was feeling sad and lonely, so he went to the forest's edge and called his old friend. "Vamos fazer as pazes?" ("Shall we make up?") he cries. The red-winged tinamou responds with "Eu, nunca mais" ("What me, never again"). The Portuguese phrases are said to mimic the actual sound of the different species' calls, and the chosen dwelling places reflect their actual habitats. This story is meant to show that they are often heard but seldom seen.

=== Introduction and translocation ===
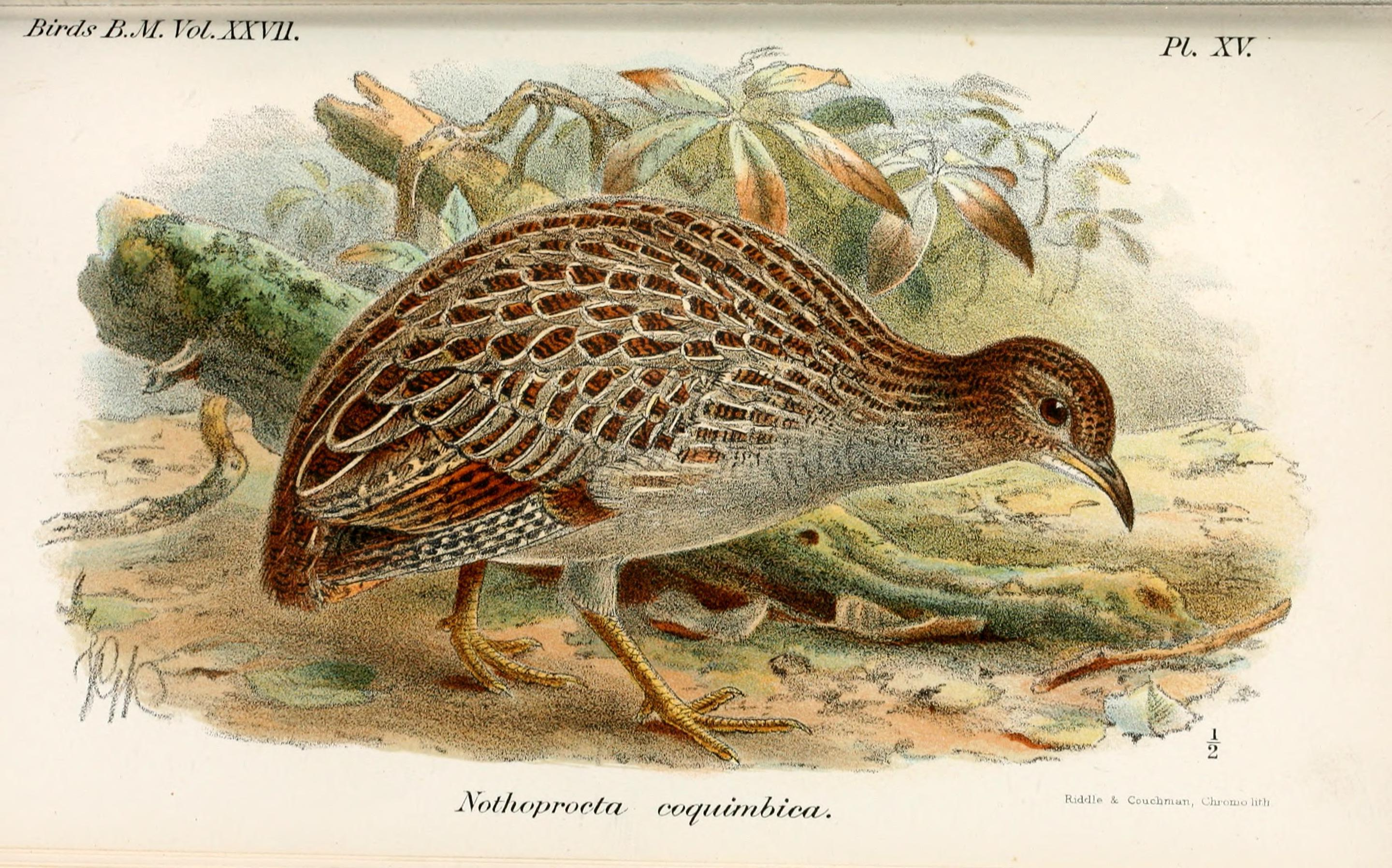
Chilean tinamous have been introduced to Easter Island.

During the 20th century, there were numerous attempts to introduce or reintroduce tinamous to various parts of the world. The red-winged tinamou has been reintroduced to the state of Rio de Janeiro, Brazil, where its wild population was hunted to extermination at the turn of the 20th century. France, Germany, and Hungary have all unsuccessfully attempted to introduce them into their countryside.

There have been several unsuccessful attempts to introduce tinamous to the United States. In Oregon, between 1966 and 1974, 473 ornate tinamous and 110 red-winged tinamou were brought in. In 1966 and 1971, Florida introduced 128 spotted nothura. In 1969, 47 and 136 spotted nothura were introduced to Alabama and Texas. 1970 saw Colorado and Oklahoma introducing 164 and 100 Darwin's nothura respectively. In 1971, Nebraska brought 256 elegant crested tinamou, and California introduced 217 in 1969, and 1200 between 1971 and 1977. The 1885 introduction of Chilean tinamou to Easter Island was successful, though the population has not prospered since Chimango caracaras were introduced in 1928.

=== Domestication and aviculture ===
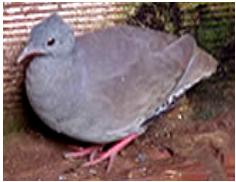
The small-billed tinamou has been considered a suitable candidate for domestication

No tinamou species has been successfully domesticated so far, despite their ability to breed well in captivity. The red-winged tinamou has been bred on farms in France, Great Britain, Belgium, and Denmark. They, along with some of the Crypturellus species, are being bred in Rio Grande do Sul to boost numbers for hunting. Hybridization can occur.

Many South American zoos hold tinamous, as do some private estates. Examples of captive breeding are small-billed tinamou in Minas Gerais and red-winged tinamou in Rio Grande do Sul. The small-billed tinamou has looked promising for domestication as the birds can raise three to four broods per year and are resistant to diseases that affect domestic chickens.

=== Pests ===
Several species have adapted to agricultural systems and will enter grain fields after the harvest to glean the ground; they will also enter the fields during the growing season, to the dismay of the farmers. Some, in particular the ornate and Andean tinamous, will dig up tubers such as potatoes, while red-winged tinamous create similar problems in peanut plantations. However, some members of Nothoprocta will prey on insect pests without damaging the crops. Spotted nothuras have been documented eating weeds and, of the 28 animals they were recorded as eating, 26 were considered to be pests.

=== Research ===
The Tinamiformes are one of the least studied orders of birds, despite tinamous exhibiting rare and little-understood behavioral patterns. They have male parental care, which is not always associated with polyandry or sex-role reversal. Their varied mating systems and diverse habitats have the potential, through comparative studies, to explain how ecological differences affect mating strategies. In some species, females cooperate in assembling clutches of eggs for different males. However, methodological difficulties have hampered behavioral research, especially on the forest-dwelling species, because their secretive behavior and cryptic coloration make them difficult to follow for continuous observation. It was not until 2003 that the first scientific symposium on tinamous was organized at the VIIth Neotropical Ornithological Congress, held at Termas de Puyehue, Chile.

== Status and conservation ==
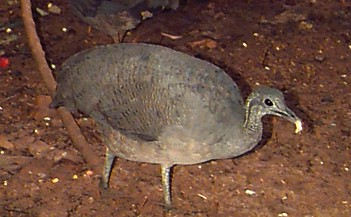
The solitary tinamou is listed under CITES

The status of the family is not easy to determine as many species live in the Amazon Basin or the far reaches of the Andes and attract little attention, even from ornithologists. Moreover, their cryptic coloration and behavior mean that their presence often remains unnoticed. A large proportion of the species are Amazonian, with the majority of these decreasing in range. Most, however, are surviving well enough so far to avoid being classified as threatened.

Major threats are habitat fragmentation and destruction. Although they are hunted throughout their range, it generally has little or only localized impact on the populations of the more widespread and common species. Pesticides are a problem throughout the grasslands and farmlands. The International Union for Conservation of Nature classifies seven tinamou species as vulnerable and seven as near threatened. The solitary tinamou is listed under Appendix I of CITES (the Convention on International Trade in Endangered Species of Wild Fauna and Flora).

=== Land clearance ===
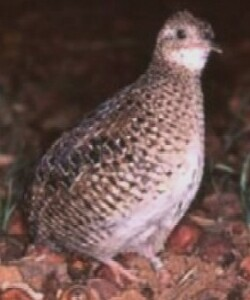
Dwarf tinamous have been badly affected by pastoral management

The major threat to the forest tinamous is deforestation. Neotropical forests are badly affected, with large tracts being clearcut for cropping, pasture or timber plantations. Much of this land is poor in nutrients, so it is abandoned after a few years for newly cleared land. Forest species are consequently forced to adapt, relocate, or die out. As well as the forests, most types of habitat in Middle and South America, apart from the high Andes and Patagonia, are under threat. There is controversy over the vegetative history, with speculation that what is now high-altitude grassland in the Andes was once elfin forest.

The dwarf tinamou is a resident of the open plains of eastern Brazil, though there are fewer than 10,000 birds left. It appears to have disappeared from its former range on the grasslands of Argentina and Paraguay. In the cerrado grasslands of Brazil, the population of the lesser nothura has also decreased to fewer than 10,000 individuals because of agricultural and economic development. The practice of burning the fields is particularly detrimental to grassland tinamous. For example, the dwarf tinamou becomes intoxicated with the smoke and vulnerable to predators. Moreover, if the burning occurs during the nesting season, the eggs or chicks are roasted.

The solitary tinamou, limited to the Atlantic forests of Brazil, Paraguay, and Argentina, is threatened by habitat destruction and hunting. In the cloud forests of northern South America, there are fewer than 10,000 black tinamous left. The tepui tinamou's range is limited to the tops of a handful of plateaus in the cloud forests of Venezuela, making it highly vulnerable to any threat.

=== Hunting ===
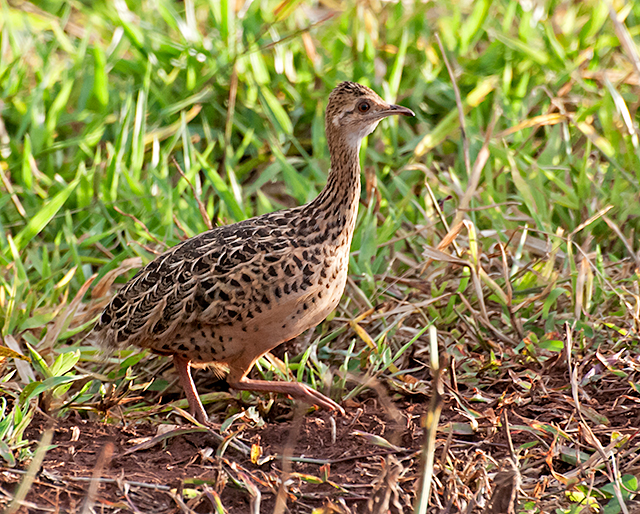
Spotted nothuras are still extensively hunted.

Tinamous have been popular game birds for many years in South America and Central America, so much so that some species' numbers have dropped. The steppe birds are more popular to hunt because they can be flushed into flight, rather than the forest birds that run to cover and hide. In the late 19th and early 20th century, hunting was responsible for mass killing within the family, with the elegant crested tinamou and spotted nothura popular targets. In 1921, Argentina urged the control of commercial hunting of several bird species, including tinamou.

Between 1890 and 1899, in Buenos Aires alone, 18 million tinamou were sold in meat markets. They were also marketed in North America as "South American partridge". One shipment alone comprised 360,000 birds. Frank Chapman of the American Museum of Natural History helped raise awareness about the rate of exploitation and its potential impact on the populations of the species. Eventually, the USA banned the importation of the birds.

Hunting pressures remain, though at a reduced level. For example, 25,000–40,000 spotted nothura are killed annually through legal hunting, not counting poaching. Although some grassland species have increased in both range and numbers, they remain vulnerable to hunting with the use of dogs to flush them. Native peoples are also involved in the killing of tinamou for meat, catching them in nooses or traps after imitating their calls. A family of seven in Ceará will consume 60 nothura per year. Tinamou species are among the most commonly harvested birds by subsistence hunting in the Americas.

Some species are highly vulnerable to illegal hunting, or poaching. In Brazil, illegal hunts take place at night by torchlight. The use of flutes to imitate the calls during the breeding season to lure the birds into the open can result in local extermination. Overall, there is a lack of adequate controls in place to ensure sustainable hunting, as well as insufficient resources and determination to enforce existing regulations.

== See also ==
- Tinamou egg of Darwin's collection
