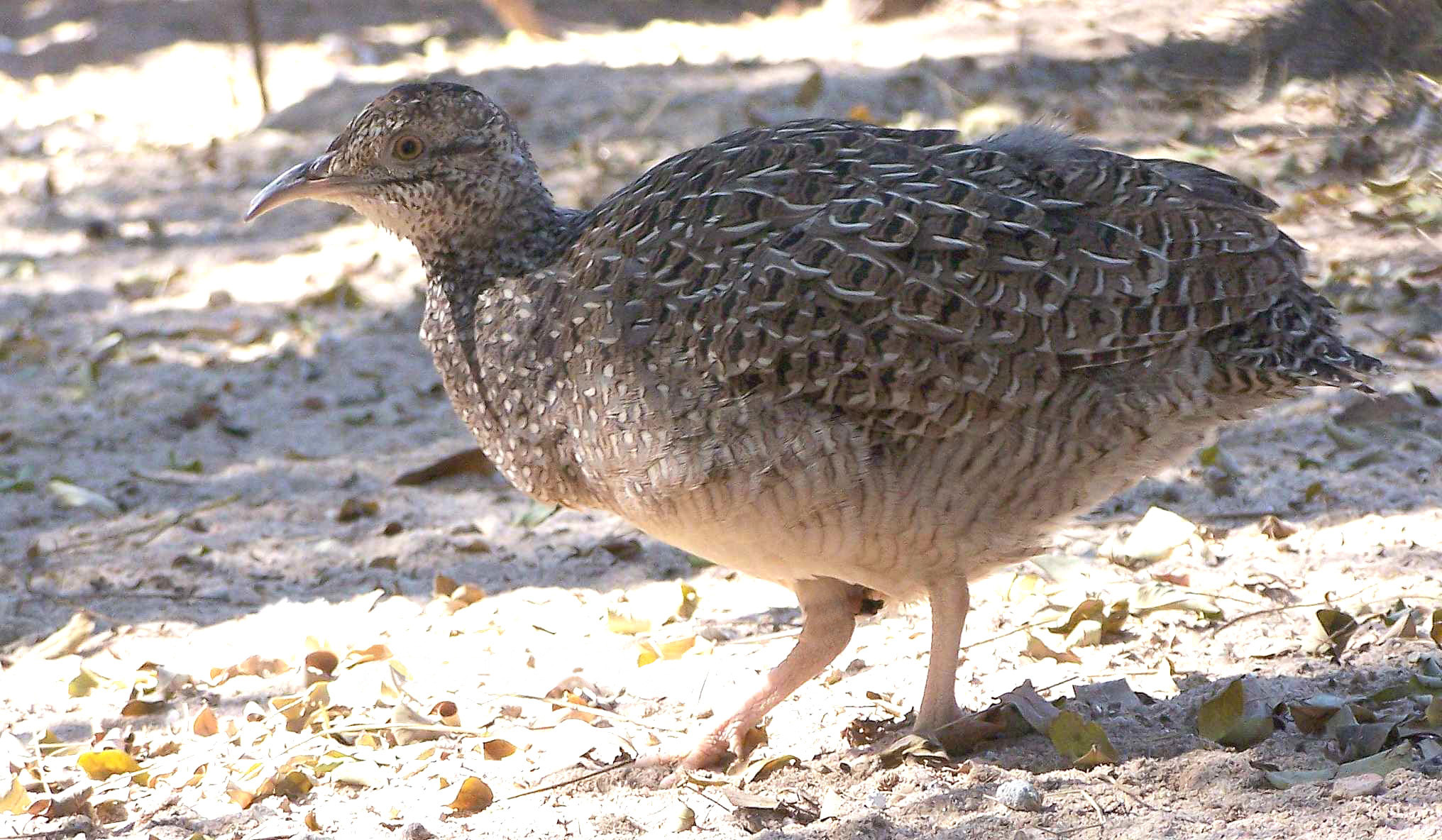
- Brushland tinamou (N. cinerascens)

Scientific classification
- Kingdom: Animalia
- Phylum: Chordata
- Class: Aves
- Infraclass: Palaeognathae
- Order: Tinamiformes
- Family: Tinamidae
- Subfamily: Nothurinae
- Genus: Nothoprocta; Sclater, PL & Salvin, 1873

Type species
- Crypturus perdicarius von Kittlitz, 1830

Species
- see text

= Nothoprocta =

Genus of birds

Nothoprocta is a genus of birds belonging to the tinamou family Tinamidae. They inhabit scrubland, grassland and open woodland in western South America, particularly in the Andes. They are poor fliers and spend most of their time on the ground. Their diet includes seeds and insects. They nest on the ground, laying large glossy eggs. The eggs are covered with feathers when a potential predator is nearby.

They are medium-sized tinamous, 26 to 36 cm (10–14 in) long. They have strong legs and fairly long, downcurved bills. The plumage is mostly grey-brown with intricate black, white and buff markings. The birds have loud, whistling calls.

== Taxonomy ==
The genus Nothoprocta was introduced in 1873 by the English ornithologists Philip Sclater and Osbert Salvin. They designated the type species as Crypturus perdicarius von Kittlitz, 1830, the Chilean tinamou. The genus name combines the Ancient Greek νοθος/nothos meaning "spurious" with πρωκτος/prōktos meaning "tail" or "rear".

== Species ==
The genus contains six species. A possible seventh species, the Kalinowski's tinamou (Nothoprocta kalinowskii), is now believed to be junior synonym of Nothoprocta ornata branickii, the ornate tinamou.

Image	Common name	Scientific name	Distribution
	Taczanowski's tinamou	Nothoprocta taczanowskii	
	Ornate tinamou	Nothoprocta ornata	
	Chilean tinamou	Nothoprocta perdicaria	
	Brushland tinamou	Nothoprocta cinerascens	
	Andean tinamou	Nothoprocta pentlandii	
	Curve-billed tinamou	Nothoprocta curvirostris	
