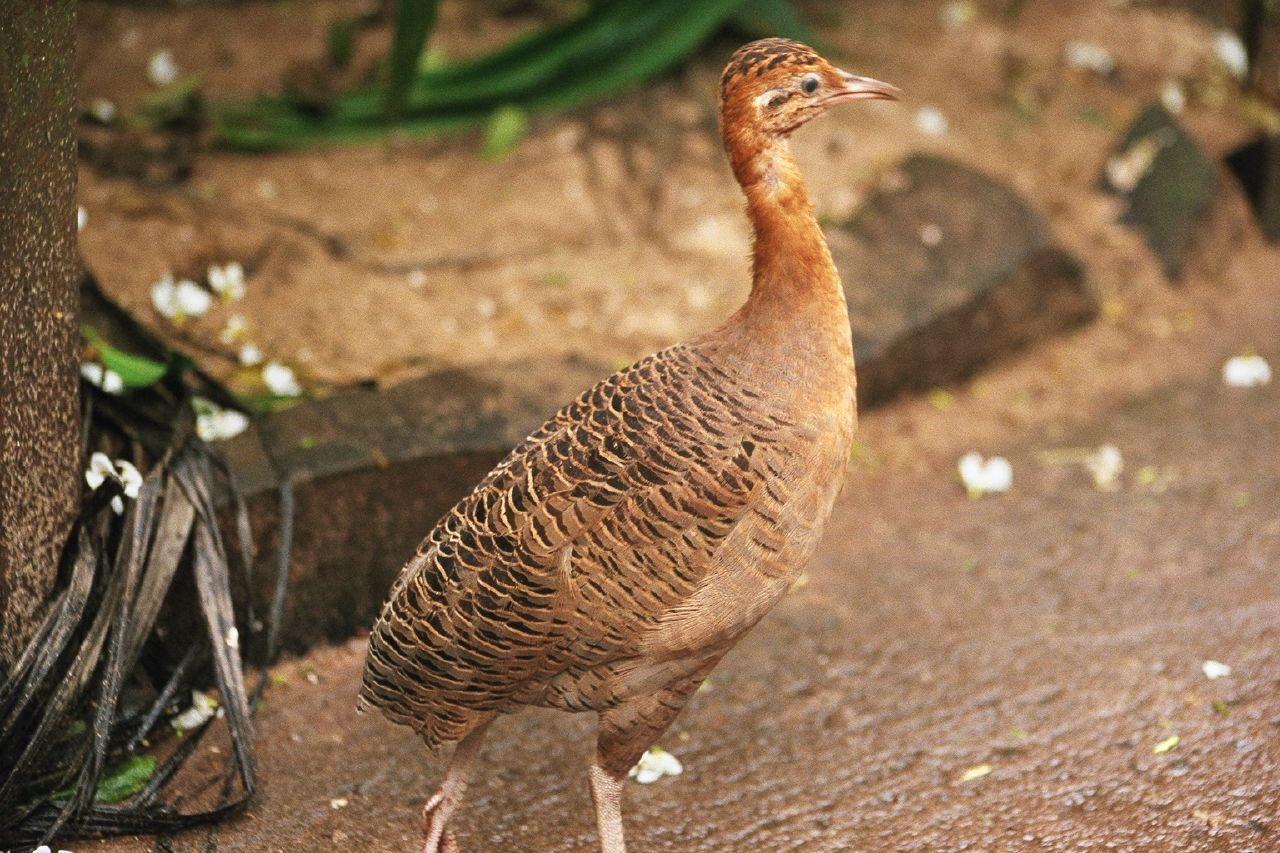
- Rhynchotus rufescens

Scientific classification
- Kingdom: Animalia
- Phylum: Chordata
- Class: Aves
- Infraclass: Palaeognathae
- Order: Tinamiformes
- Family: Tinamidae
- Subfamily: Nothurinae

Genera
- Rhynchotus; Nothoprocta; Nothura; Taoniscus; Eudromia; Tinamotis

Synonyms
- Rhynchotinae von Boetticher, 1934; Tinamotidinae Salvadori, 1895; Eudrominae von Boetticher, 1934

= Nothurinae =

Nothurinae Temporal range: Miocene–present Mid-Miocene to present

Subfamily of birds

Nothurinae or aridland tinamous is one of two subfamilies of the Tinamidae family, the other being Tinaminae. It contains eighteen species in six genera. The six genera are:

- Rhynchotus (2 species)
- Nothoprocta (6 species)
- Nothura (5 species)
- Taoniscus (monotypic) – dwarf tinamou
- Eudromia (2 species)
- Tinamotis (2 species)

== Description ==
These birds, as a member of the tinamou, are ground birds that prefer to run and walk, but will fly when needed.

== Taxonomy ==
They are related to the ratites (emus, ostriches, kiwis, and rheas), and are placed with them in the Paleognathae. All of these birds evolved from ancient birds that did fly and tinamous are believed to be a still living primitive family closely related to these ancient birds.

== Behavior ==
Tinamous eat leaves, buds, small fruits and seeds, and will eats insects for variety.

== Range and habitat ==
The members of this subfamily live in South America and prefer hills and arid grasslands and scrublands as opposed to the Tinaminae, which prefer forests.
