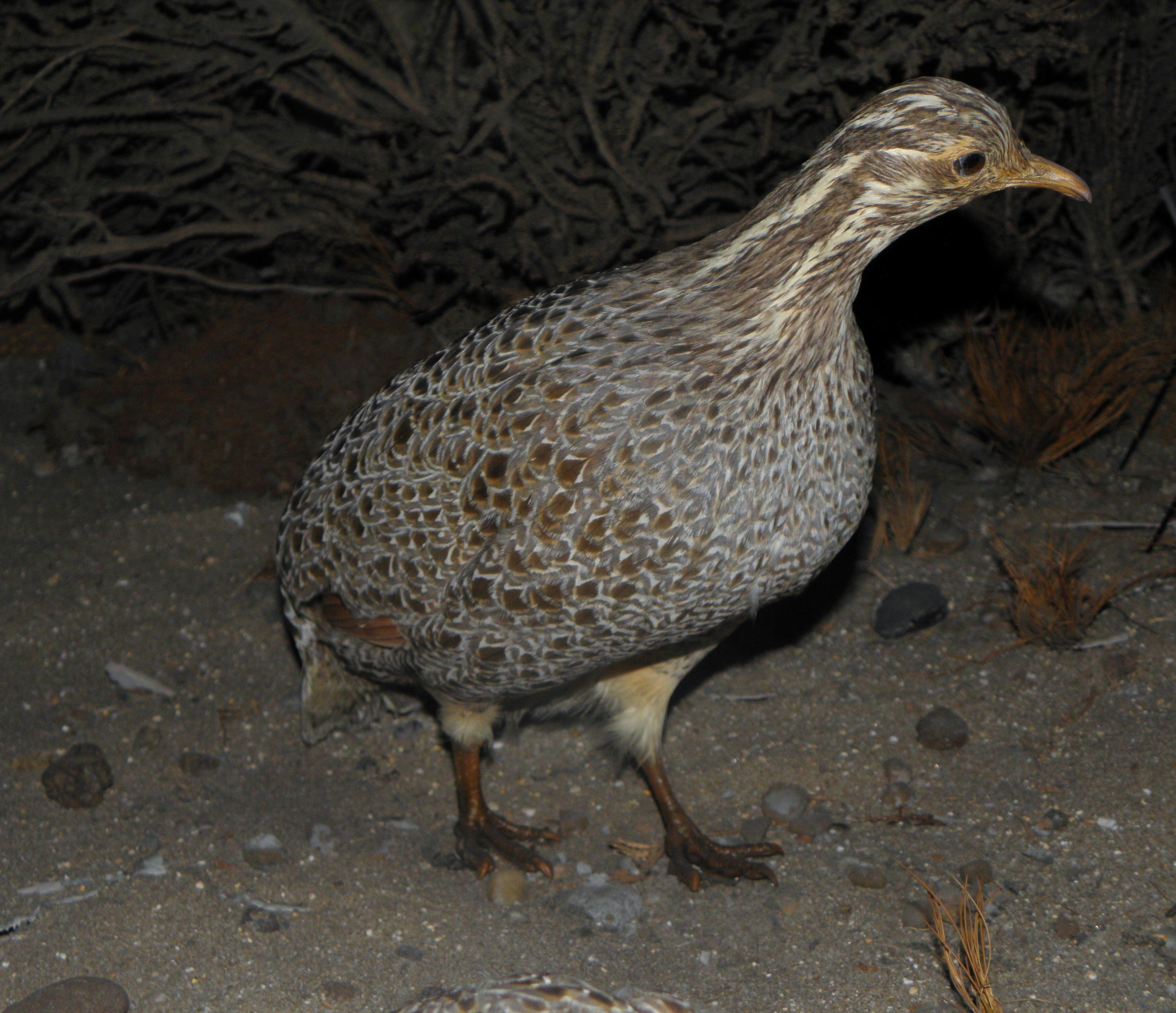

Conservation status
- Least Concern (IUCN 3.1)

Scientific classification
- Kingdom: Animalia
- Phylum: Chordata
- Class: Aves
- Infraclass: Palaeognathae
- Order: Tinamiformes
- Family: Tinamidae
- Genus: Tinamotis
- Species: T. ingoufi

Binomial name
- Tinamotis ingoufi Oustalet, 1890

= Patagonian tinamou =

Species of bird

The Patagonian tinamou (Tinamotis ingoufi) also known as Ingouf's tinamou is a member of one of the most ancient groups of paleognath birds, the tinamous. This species is native to southern South America.

== Taxonomy ==
The Patagonian tinamou is a monotypic species. All tinamou are from the family Tinamidae, and in the larger scheme are also ratites. Unlike other ratites, tinamous can fly, although in general, they are not strong fliers. All ratites evolved from prehistoric flying birds, and tinamous are the closest living relative of these birds.

== Description ==
The Patagonian tinamou is approximately 35 cm (14 in) in length. Its upper parts are grey spotted with black, its throat is white, its breast is rufous and its belly is cinnamon.

== Behavior ==
Like other tinamous, the ornate tinamou eats fruit off the ground or low-lying bushes. They also eat small amounts of invertebrates, flower buds, tender leaves, seeds, and roots. The male incubates the eggs which may come from as many as 4 different females, and then will raise them until they are ready to be on their own, usually 2–3 weeks. The nest is located on the ground in dense brush or between raised root buttresses.

== Range and habitat ==
The Patagonian tinamou inhabits temperate grassland habitats at altitude 200 to 800 m (660–2,620 ft). It can also be found on savannah and brushland. Its range is southern Chile and southwestern Argentina.

== Conservation ==
The IUCN list this species as Least Concern, with an occurrence range of 400,000 km^{2} (150,000 sq mi).
