= Samuel Alejandro Lafone Quevedo =

Argentine-Uruguayan archaeologist, ethnographer, linguist

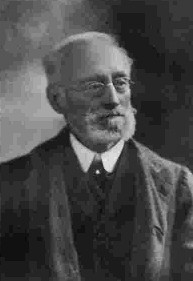
- Samuel A. Lafone Quevedo
- Born: February 28, 1835; Montevideo, Uruguay
- Died: July 18, 1920 (aged 85); La Plata, Argentina
- Resting place: La Plata Cemetery
- Other names: Samuel Alexander Lafone y Quevedo, Samuel Alexander Lafone Quevedo, Don Samuel
- Occupations: industrialist, humanist, archaeologist, ethnographer, linguist
- Organization: National Academy of History of the Argentine Republic
- Parent(s): Samuel Fisher Lafone and María Quevedo y Alsina
- Relatives: Alfred Lafone (uncle)

Samuel Alejandro Lafone Quevedo (Montevideo, 28 February 1835 – La Plata, 18 July 1920) was an Argentine industrialist, humanist, archaeologist, ethnographer, and linguist who was born in Uruguay.

His father was Samuel Fisher Lafone, an Englishman of Huguenot origin, and his mother was Argentinian María de Quevedo y Alsina. He studied in England and graduated with a Master of Arts degree and a BA in humanities. Back in the Americas, he settled in Catamarca, Argentina, and took charge of his father's mining company and later of his own company, which he created after selling the former.

Lafone delved deeply into the study of the region's indigenous history. He discovered the Ruins of Quilmes and authored the book Londres and Catamarca, in which he published the results of his investigations. He also studied the relationships of the Juríes indigenous people (the Lules and Tonocotés or Tonokotés, nicknamed surís or ñandú by the Quechua invaders), researched the family relationships of the local indigenous population, and founded schools for these populations in Catamarca, as well as other schools for orphans and poverty-stricken communities.

In the late 19th century, he returned to Buenos Aires, where he took charge of La Plata Museum and the Faculty of Natural Sciences of the National University of La Plata. He received several awards during his career, including an Honorary Doctorate from the University of Buenos Aires (UBA). During this period, he also published the results of his research in several scientific journals.

== Early life ==
At the age of thirteen, his father sent him to England, where he graduated with a Master of Arts degree, equivalent to a BA in humanities. In 1859, back in the Americas, he settled in Catamarca and took charge of the Capillitas Mines. He also bought a carob tree plantation located 25 km from Andalgalá with the money obtained from the sale of the Victoria plant that he inherited from his parents. He named this enterprise Pilciao and it remained in operation until 1894. Other jobs that required less effort, such as the sugar industry or the building of the railroad, made labor increasingly more expensive, which meant that this type of enterprise was no longer profitable. In 1902, he sold the property to the Capillitas Copper Company.

== Professional background ==
Lafone was interested in the indigenous culture of the area. He travelled around the region, starting in Bolivia, and gathered data from the periods before and during the Inca Empire. He received support from his friends Bartolomé Mitre, Vicente F. López, and doctors Francisco Moreno and Juan B. Ambrosetti. Between 1883 and 1885, he wrote a series of articles for La Nación on various topics related to the archaeology, ethnography, geography, linguistics, folklore, and history of Catamarca. Years later, with some corrections, he gathered those articles and published them in book form under the title Londres y Catamarca. Regarding his interest in archaeology, he stated:

Arriving back in Montevideo on 25 December 1858, I soon became the owner of an edition (the new one) of the history of Deán Funes, which at that time was the best encyclopedic reference concerning the Conquest of Tucumán. With it in my hands, I was happy and more than satisfied, [upon learning] that the Quilmes people had been born in Calchaquí and that, by the grace of God and the prowess of the Spaniards and their weapons, they had left El Bañado ....

— Las migraciones de los kilmes: la historia de las mismas

During one of his excursions, he discovered the Ruins of Quilmes, more precisely in the year 1888, when he made a quick visit to the site that allowed him to understand the complexity of the work. He refers to the ruins in his book Londres y Catamarca, as follows:

The ruins seemed to us at first to be like the enormous dens of the plains viscacha because, seen from a distance, they appeared as piles of rubble with their corresponding entrances. But after entering the building, we understood it for what it was: a series of stone huts huddled together like honeycombs in a beehive. Thus, we were able to march on horseback with the greatest of ease and entirely without risk over the top of the walls, which in part were two varas wide, and in general more than one vara wide. From time to time, we reached narrow paths that looked like streets.

In the Pucará (of Aconquija) it would be easy to say: this was the palace of the Sapa Inca, this was his court's palace ... but in Quilmes, the republican equality is the one that stands out and that is why everything looks like a honeycomb.

Fortunately, the town of Quilmes is in a remote corner of the Valley. And for now, its labyrinth of half-buried walls is not in danger. But no one would deny that these ruins should be preserved for our history as soon as possible ....

— Londres y Catamarca, pages 3-5

In 1890, economic circumstances changed, which forced him to start selling his properties at a very low price. He moved to Buenos Aires where he was awarded an Honorary Doctorate by the Faculty of Philosophy and Letters of the University of Buenos Aires (UBA). In 1906, he took charge of La Plata Museum and, at the same time, joined the Faculty of Natural Sciences of the National University of La Plata as dean. He also became involved with the Society of History and Numismatics.

One of his students described him in this manner:

... a small, petite, agile, thin figure, as if stylized by the long passage of time. The figure of that illustrious elderly man, who looked like something out of a museum, with his jacket buttoned up to the top, archaeological in style, its color faded by time, with his huge green umbrella in his nervous and skinny hands, like a character from Dickens. With his scarf made from vicuña wool woven on his loom in Catamarca wrapped around his neck, he walked through the corridors of the Faculty of Law and Social Sciences of the National University of La Plata, on his way to office of the university's president, of which he was the seal keeper. And we, the noisy students, who in the years before the University Reform saw him walk by, kept a respectful and involuntary silence for a little while.

— Márquez Miranda, a student of Lafone Quevedo

== Works by Lafone Quevedo ==
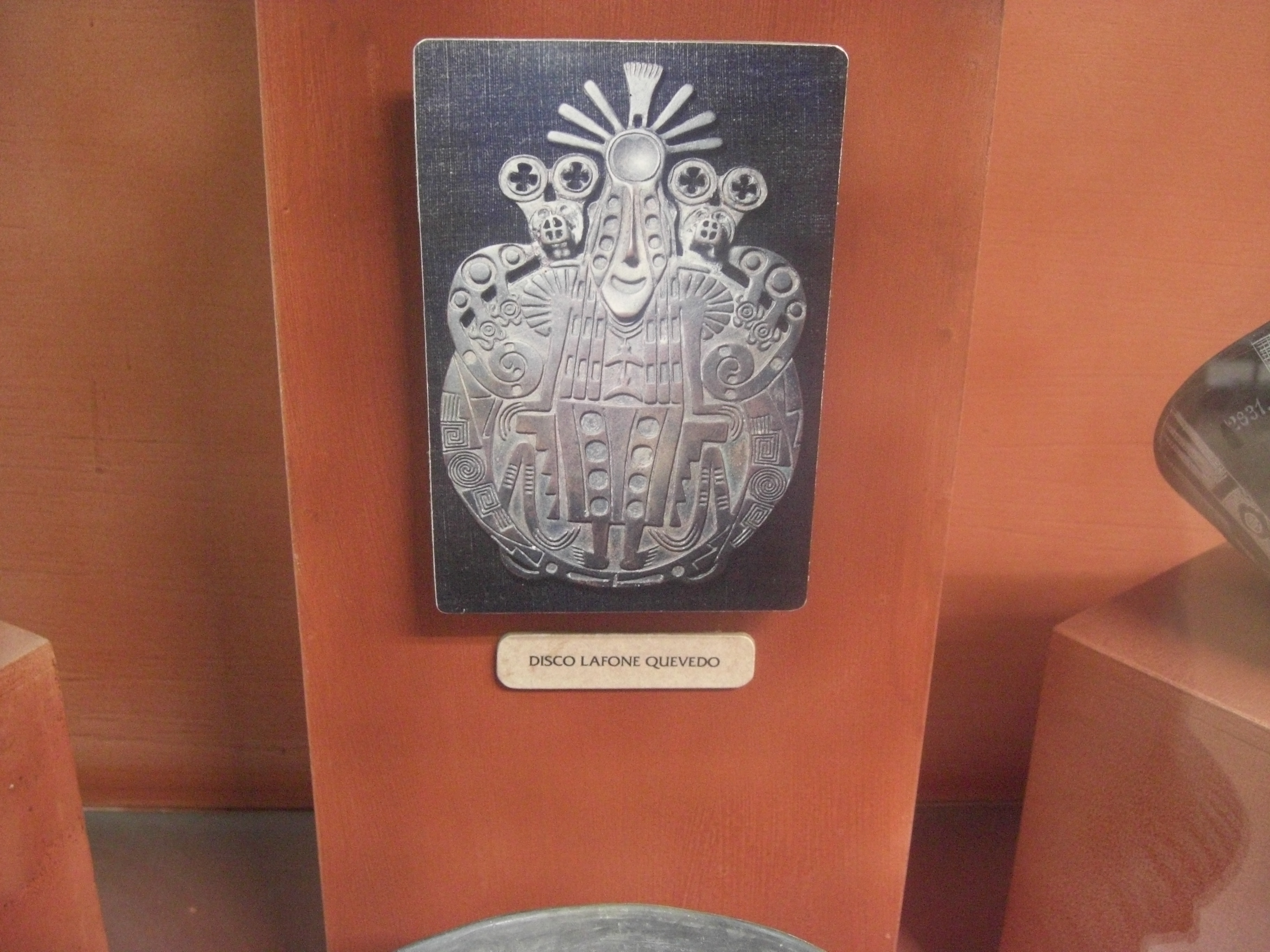
Lafone Quevedo Disk. La Plata Museum, display case of La Aguada culture

In 1888, he began writing Historia de la Virgen del Valle, as the Virgin of the Valley was the patron saint of the city of San Fernando del Valle de Catamarca. He had a profound religious faith, which he professed until his last days.

His book Londres y Catamarca consisted of 400 pages. The chapter titles are Introducción (Introduction), Treinta cartas (Thirty Letters), Epílogo (Epilogue), and Apéndices (Appendices). The aim of the book was, according to what the author wrote in the prologue, to study the expedition of Diego de Roxas, the geographical location of the cities of Londres, Córdoba, and Calchaquí, and the foundations of the capital city of the province of Catamarca (San Fernando del Valle) and the city of Londres. There are several copies in print, although the location of only two is known so far: one in the library of the Juan B. Ambrosetti Museum of Ethnography in Buenos Aires and, according to the ACCEDER Digital Content Network catalog, there is another one at the Isaac Fernández Blanco Museum of Hispano-American Art.

He studied the relationships of the Juríes indigenous people and researched the ethnological background of the region's various indigenous communities. In Catamarca, he founded schools for these populations that also served as homes for orphans and children from poverty-stricken communities. He also served as inspector of elementary education in the region of Andalgalá between 1878 and 1892. Some of his students were mentioned in a text written by Father Ramón Rosa Olmos:

... Pedro Ignacio Cabrera, who would become a pianist. Dr. Argentino R. Quevedo, who would occupy the office of the deputy governor of the province and a seat in the provincial legislature; Antonio Macías, accountant of the trading house Móller de Andalgalá, senator, provincial deputy, and general director of revenue of the province; Father Joaquín Tula, parish priest of Andalgalá and priest of the Church of La Merced in Tucumán; Mr. Ramón Martínez, secretary in Andalgalá of Mr. David Arce, accountant general of the province and general director of revenue...

As a diversion, he formed an orchestra with his pupils and they ended up playing fairly well.

== Bibliography ==
Works published by the researcher include:

- Lóndres y Catamarca: cartas á La Nación, 1883, 84 y 85 : con apéndices y un mapa histórico
- Vocabulario Mocoví-español fundado en los del P. Tavollini, published in the journal of the La Plata Museum, Buenos Aires, 1893
- A traveller's notes in the Calchaqui region, Argentine Republic, published in American Anthropologist, Washington, 1891
- Un capítulo suelto de filología argentina, published in La Prensa, Buenos Aires, 1892
- Los huacos de Yocavil. Yacimiento de Cerro Pintado en el valle de Catamarca, published in La Nación, Buenos Aires, 1892
- Ensayo Mitológico. El culto de Tonapa. Los himnos sagrados de los reyes del Cuzco, según el Yamqui Pachacuti, published in the journal of La Plata Museum, Buenos Aires, 1892
- Catálogo descriptivo e ilustrado de las Huacas de Chañar-Yaco (provincia de Catamarca), published in the journal of the La Plata Museum, Buenos Aires, 1892
- La Virgen del Valle, published in Artes y Letras, Vol. 1, Buenos Aires, 1892.
- Arte de la lengua Toba por el padre Alonso Bárcena, published in the journal of the La Plata Museum, Buenos Aires, 1893
- Tesoro de catamarqueñismos; nombres de lugar y apellidos indios con etimologías y eslabones aislados de la lengua cacana
- Idioma Abipón
- Los indios chanases y su lengua con apuntes sobre los querandíes, yaros, boanes, güenoas o minuanes y un mapa étnico
- La raza Pampeana y la raza Guaraní: ó, los indios del Rio de la Plata en el siglo XVI
- El museo de La Plata y los valles calchaquíes, published in La Prensa, Buenos Aires, 6 August 1891
- Las migraciones de los Kilmes. La historia de las mismas, published in the journal of the University of Buenos Aires, 1919

== See also ==
- Linguistic areas of the Americas
- Mataco–Guaicuru languages
- Abipón
- Calchaquí
- Charrúa
- Lule people
- Querandí
- Quilmes people
- Toba Qom language
- Tonocoté
- Vilela people
- Wichí
- Indigenous peoples in the Santiago del Estero region
- Ruins of Quilmes
- Pámpidos
- La Aguada culture
- Gregorio Funes
- Friedrich Schickendantz
