= Marcelo Bórmida =

- Born: 1925; Rome, Italy
- Died: September 20, 1978 (aged 58); Buenos Aires, Argentina
- Other name: El Tano
- Occupations: Archaeologist, Physical anthropologist, Ethnologist
- Known for: Historical-cultural school of German-Austrian diffusionism

Marcelo Bórmida (1925, Rome - September 20, 1978, Buenos Aires) also known as el Tano, was an Argentine archaeologist, physical anthropologist, and ethnologist of Italian descent. He became one of the prominent representatives of the historical-cultural school derived from German-Austrian diffusionism. Due to his academic positions, which limited the development of other theoretical currents, and his political alignment with fascism and military governments in Argentina, he is considered one of the most controversial figures in Argentine anthropology.

== Biography ==
Marcelo Bórmida studied biological sciences in Italy and collaborated with the racial Sergio Sergi (son and successor of the founder of Italian physical anthropology, Giuseppe Sèrgi) until 1946 when he settled in Argentina and continued his studies at the University of Buenos Aires. There, he was mentored by José Imbelloni and Oswald Menghin, both representatives of diffusionist theoretical currents, which Bórmida strongly adhered to during his time as an archaeologist. Initially, he worked alongside Imbelloni at the Museum of Ethnography and remained at the institution after Imbelloni stepped down from the directorship.

In 1953, he obtained a degree in history with a specialization in Anthropology and Ethnography with the thesis El complejo ergológico y mítico del churinga en Australia (The ergological and mythical complex of churinga in Australia); by the end of the same year, he earned his doctoral title with the thesis Los antiguos patagones (The ancient Patagonians), both from the University of Buenos Aires. He would go on to have a significant presence at the university, occupying a central role within anthropology until his passing in 1978. Throughout this extensive period, he managed to continue his research despite the political changes in the country that affected Argentine science (such as the Night of the Long Batons, coups d'état, the rise of Peronism and Anti-Peronism, among others).

Starting in 1957, he held the position of professor of Anthropology and also became the director of the Institute of Anthropology within the Department of Anthropological Sciences, along with Ciro René Lafón. He also directed the Museo Etnográfico Juan B. Ambrosetti. Bórmida played a significant role in the establishment of the Bachelor of Anthropological Sciences program at the University of Buenos Aires in 1958, the same year the program was established at the National University of La Plata. He also served as the director of the journal Runa on multiple occasions.

In 1958, he married archaeologist Amalia Sanguinetti.

He began his fieldwork on Easter Island (Chile), then continued in the Pampa and Argentine Patagonia before focusing his research on indigenous populations in the Gran Chaco and lowlands of South America. Throughout his academic career, he went through three stages: an initial period characterized by his adherence to diffusionism, during which he mainly conducted research in physical anthropology (raciology) and archaeology; a second stage, beginning in 1956, where he introduced Ethnology while still conducting archaeological research, now in the San Matías Gulf coast in the Río Negro Province; and a third stage, towards the late 1960s, in which he experimented with phenomenology and founded what he referred to as tautegorical ethnology.

He supervised or trained a significant number of individuals, aided by his charismatic personality. Among them were his wife Amalia Sanguinetti, Hugo Ratier, Leopoldo Bartolomé, Eduardo Menéndez, Norberto Pelissero, Celia Mashnshnek, among others. However, over time, many of them, including the first three mentioned, distanced themselves from Bórmida and held highly critical views of his political and academic positions.

In 1973, during the government of Héctor J. Cámpora, he was expelled from the University of Buenos Aires, which led to the founding of the Argentine Center of American Ethnology (Centro Argentino de Etnología Americana, CAEA), where he retreated until he and his group of disciples regained academic power with the 1976 coup d'état. He and his group were subsequently accused of complicity with the last military dictatorship and of maintaining outdated academic ideas.

He died on September 20, 1978, due to a cardiovascular condition, at the age of 58.
