= Calchaquí Wars =

16th-century wars between Diaguita Confederation and the Spanish Empire

Date	1560-1667
Location	Jujuy Provence; Salta Provence; Tucumán Provence; Catamarca Provence; La Rioja Provence
Result	Spanish Victory

Belligerents
Calchaquí; Quilmes; Omaguacas; Yocavil; Tafí; Chicoana; Tilcaras; Purmamarcas; Casabindos; Apatama; Chicha; Jurí	Spanish Empire; Allied tribes

Commanders and leaders
Juan Calchaquí; Viltipoco; Quipildor; Chalamín; José Henriquez; Pedro Bohórquez	(Spanish Empire) Juan Pérez de Zurita; (Spanish Empire) Francisco de Argañaras; (Spanish Empire) Alonso Mercado; (Spanish Empire) Julián Cedeño

The Calchaquí Wars (Spanish: Guerras calchaquíes) were a series of military conflicts between the Diaguita Confederation and the Spanish Empire in the 1560–1667 period. The wars raged in the Argentine Northwest, in what are now the provinces of Jujuy, Salta, Tucumán, Catamarca and La Rioja.

== First War ==
In 1559, the gobernador Juan Pérez de Zurita founded the city of Córdoba de Calchaquí; he then expected local tribes to submit to the encomienda system of servitude, but these tribes resisted this attempt. Spanish Captain Julián Cedeño captured a curaca known as Chumbicha, and Zurita used him to negotiate with his brother who was the curaca of the town of Tolombón, who accepted baptism as part of the negotiations, becoming then known under the Christian name of Juan Calchaquí.

However, once Juan Calchaquí understood the unequal nature of the encomienda he rebelled and led attacks against the Spanish, evicting them of the three cities founded by Zurita: Córdoba de Calchaquí, Londres in present-day Catamarca Province and Cañete. After the Omaguacas also revolted and destroyed ciudad de Nieva, now known as San Salvador de Jujuy, the whole Spanish population of Tucumán was forced to concentrate in Santiago del Estero further east. This was a serious setback for the Spanish conquistadors and in historiography favourable to Spain the war has been labelled "one of the worst tragedies of our history".
