= Alonso Mercado y Villacorta =

Spanish civil servant

Alonso de Mercado y Villacorta, Marquis of Villacorta was a Spanish civil servant, acting in the Río de la Plata area of the Viceroyalty of Peru.

Born in Catalonia, he was Governor of Tucumán from 1655 to 1660. He was conned by Pedro Bohórquez, a Spanish adventurer who promised Mercado access to the hidden location of Inca treasures and afterwards had to suppress a revolt of Indians led by Bohórquez.

Afterwards, he was nominated as Governor of the Río de la Plata, a position that he held between 1660 and 1663. He ordered the transfer of the city of Santa Fe to its present location. In 1662, he expelled the Society of Jesus from its initial location on the Plaza de Mayo, as its buildings interfered with shooting practices of nearby Buenos Aires' "fortress" (the current Casa Rosada).

His request for royal authorization to commerce with two foreign ships a year was denied. Nonetheless, he allowed Dutch ships to dock in the Buenos Aires port. Because of his tolerance for the contraband of goods and slaves, he was subjected to a tribunal of grievances, but the case was dismissed. He was demoted and again became Governor of Tucumán (1664–1670). He founded San José de Metán (1665) and fortified the city of Talavera de Esteco to prevent further attacks from the Indians. He conducted a final campaign against Calchaquí Indians, and ordered the exile of 200 families of Quilmes Indians to Buenos Aires.

== See also ==
- Baltasar de la Cueva Enríquez
