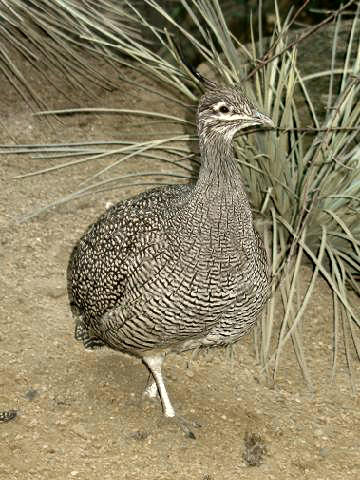
- At the Bronx Zoo, New York City

Conservation status
- Least Concern (IUCN 3.1)

Scientific classification
- Kingdom: Animalia
- Phylum: Chordata
- Class: Aves
- Infraclass: Palaeognathae
- Order: Tinamiformes
- Family: Tinamidae
- Genus: Eudromia
- Species: E. elegans

Binomial name
- Eudromia elegans Saint-Hilaire, 1832

Subspecies
- E. e. elegans(Saint-Hilaire, 1832); E. e. intermedia (Dabbene & Lillo, 1913); E. e. magnistriata (Olrog, 1959); E. e. riojana (Olrog, 1959); E. e. albida (Wetmore, 1921); E. e. multiguttata (Conover, 1950); E. e. devia (Conover, 1950); E. e. patagonica (Conover, 1950); E. e. wetmorei (Banks, 1977); E. e. numida (Banks, 1977)

Synonyms
- Calodromas elegans (d'Orb. & Geoff.); Calopezus elegans

= Elegant crested tinamou =

Species of bird

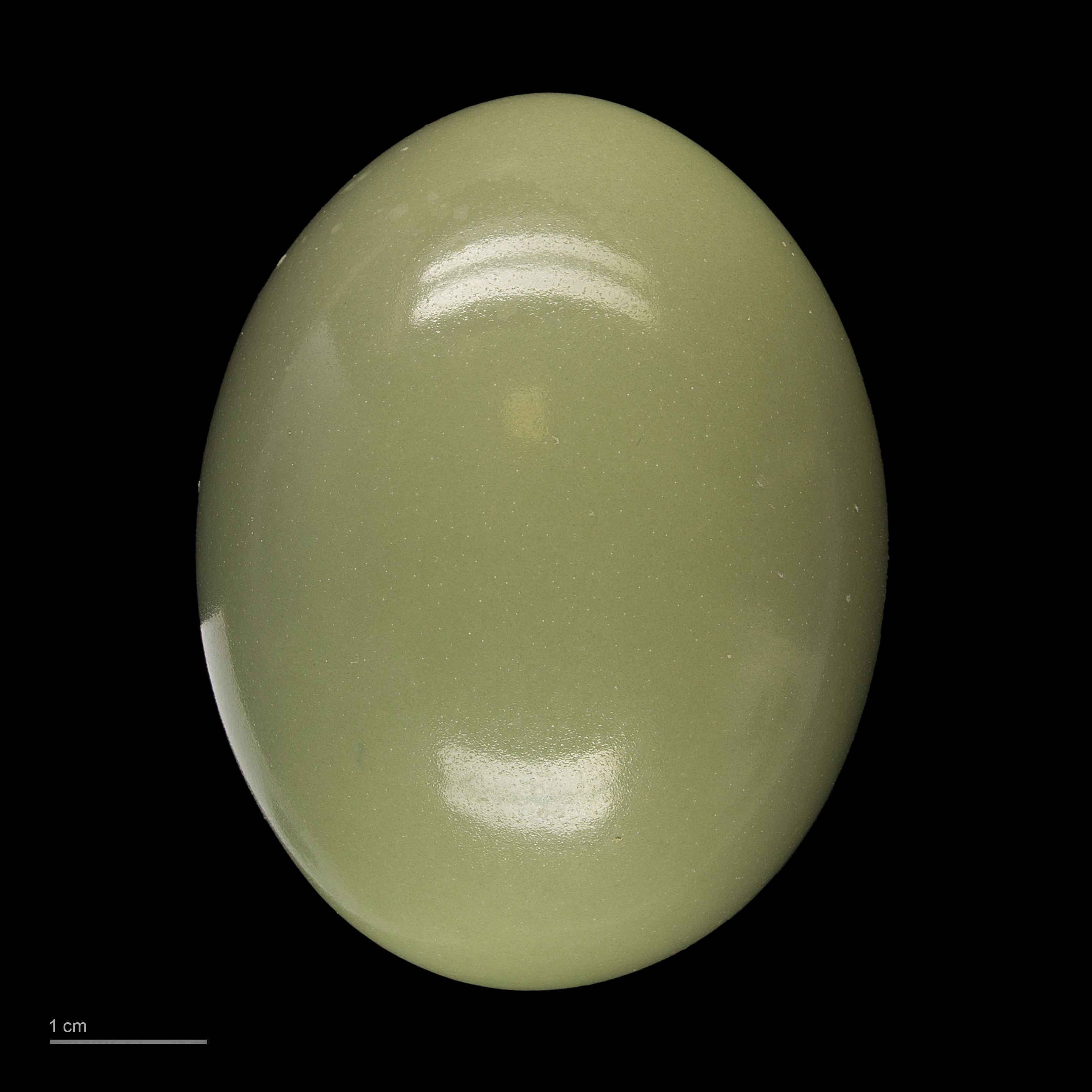
Eudromia elegans

The elegant crested tinamou or martineta tinamou (Eudromia elegans) is a medium-sized tinamou that can be found in southern Chile and Argentina in Shrubland. The bird has an omnivorous diet. This species is terrestrial due to their poor flying ability.

== Description ==
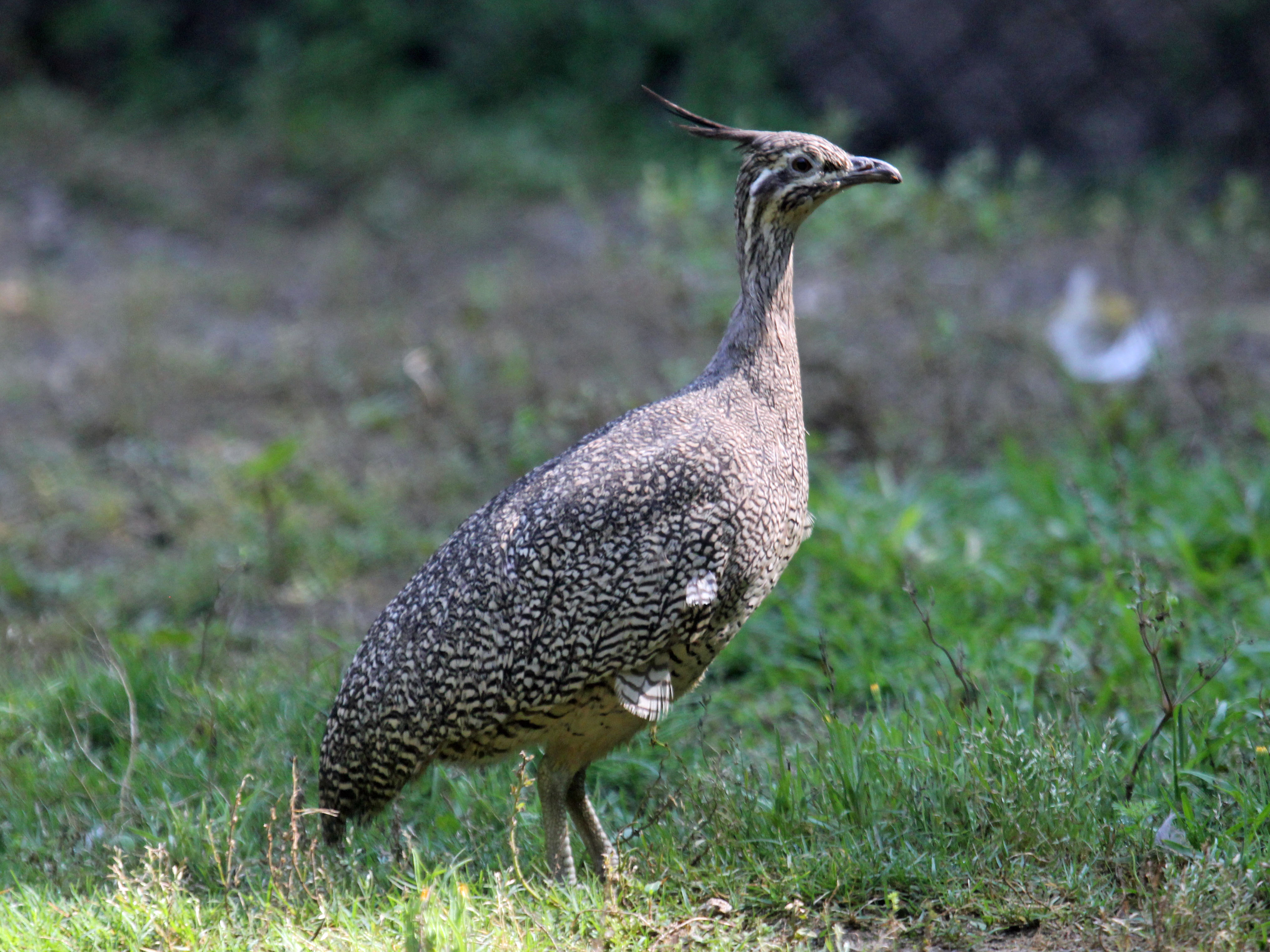
At the Sylvan Heights Bird Park, North Carolina, US

The elegant-crested tinamou is a partridge-like shaped bird with rounded wings. The bird is an olive-brown color with the plumage being mainly black and white vermiculations. The bird has a long off-white stripe that starts above the eye and continues down the side of the neck. The beak is short, comes to a sharp upright point. The species legs and feet are short and strong, built for running. Both of those features have a whitish-grey coloring. The elegant-crested tinamou averages 39 to 41 cm (15–16 in) long. They can be found in flocks of about 5-10 birds, and are often detected by whistle calls.

== Habitat ==
The elegant crested tinamou avoids tall and dense grasses and very thick stands of brush. Ideal environments include dry arid grasslands, open thicket, dry savanna, exposed hills with outlying patches of bushes, and cultivated farmlands. This bird is found in higher elevations(2,500 m (8,200 ft)) and found all the way down to sea level. They live throughout Argentina and Chile. In 1970, there was an attempted introduction of 89 birds near Benkelman, Nebraska, but it was unsuccessful.

== Diet and foraging ==
While the elegant crested tinamou is classified as omnivorous, their diet varies depending on the season. During winter their diet consists of plant grain, fruits, leaves, and buds, However, in the summer they eat an abundant amount of insects that inhabit the area. When searching for food they cover large distances unless the food is plentiful, they will stay in that same area.

== Behavior ==
The crested-tinamou is very terrestrial, it often runs and walks on the ground, unlike other birds. They spend the night at regular roost-sites. To clean, they perform regular dust-bathing in order to remove parasites from their plumage. In case of being hunted the birds are extremely wary. When one is alarmed they stand very tall to look for the source of danger then retreat to cover; they either hide behind vegetation or flatten themselves on the ground and bow their head down to feet level. The call they use is a loud sad whistle.

== Breeding ==
The nest is a hollow on the ground formed by both birds and situated close to a low bush. Only the male provides parental care, incubates the eggs, and raises the young. When the young chicks hatch, they are down-covered and can run. They leave the nest almost immediately, but remain with the male for a certain period of time, becoming independent by three to four months of age. The tinamou, unlike others, flocks regularly, especially in winter.

== Flight ==
The elegant crested tinamou can fly short distances, but they are not adequately built to fly. They can only fly about 500 meters, before landing again. In areas where there are very few obstacles, they glide with interspersed flaps, recalling partridges. Due to the short wings and tail, if the bird loses control at take-off, it may fly into obstacles such as branches, wires, or walls, which can have fatal consequences.

== Migration ==
The elegant crested tinamou stays stationary in its range, during winter they move in groups and cover large territories in the search for food.

== Etymology ==
Eudromia comes from two Greek words, eu meaning well or nicely, and dromos meaning a running escape. These definitions together mean, nice running escape, which refers to their habit of escaping predators by running. Finally, elegans means neat or elegant, and martinete is Spanish for night heron because its elegant crest is reminiscent of a night heron's crest.

== Taxonomy ==
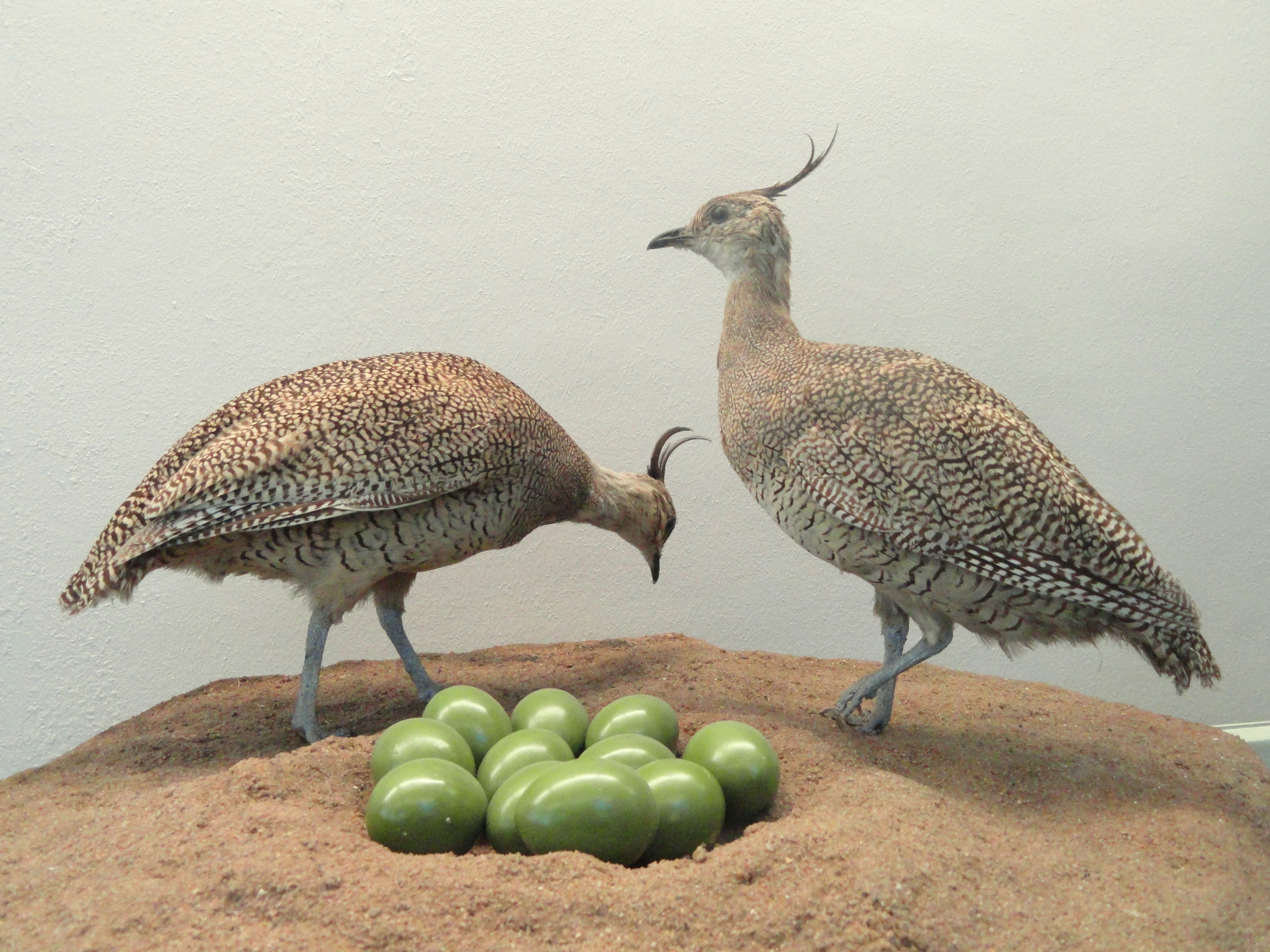
A pair of elegant crested tinamou, taxidermied, and eggs at the Naturmuseum Senckenberg, Frankfurt am Main, Germany

All tinamou are from the family Tinamidae, and in the larger scheme are also ratites. Unlike other ratites, tinamous can fly, although in general they are not strong fliers. All ratites evolved from prehistoric flying birds, and tinamous are the closest living relative of these birds.

Isidore Geoffroy Saint-Hilaire first identified the elegant crested tinamou from a specimen from South America, in 1832.

=== Subspecies ===
- E. e. elegans, the nominate race, occurs in central Argentina; Neuquén and Rio Negro Provinces
- E. e. intermedia occurs in the Andes of northwestern Argentina; Salta and Catamarca Provinces
- E. e. magnistriata occurs in the Andes of northwestern Argentina; Tucumán and northern Córdoba Provinces
- E. e. riojana occurs in the Andes of northwestern Argentina; La Rioja and San Juan Provinces
- E. e. albida occurs in the dry savannah of western Argentina, in San Juan Province
- E. e. devia occurs at the base of the Andes in southwestern Argentina in Neuquén Province
- E. e. patagonica occurs in southern Argentina; Neuquén, Rio Negro, Chubut, and Santa Cruz Provinces and adjacent southern Chile; Biobío to Magallanes y la Antártica Chilena Provinces
- E. e. numida occurs in dry grasslands of central Argentina
- E. e. wetmorei occurs in the Andean foothills of north central Mendoza Province, western Argentina

== Conservation ==
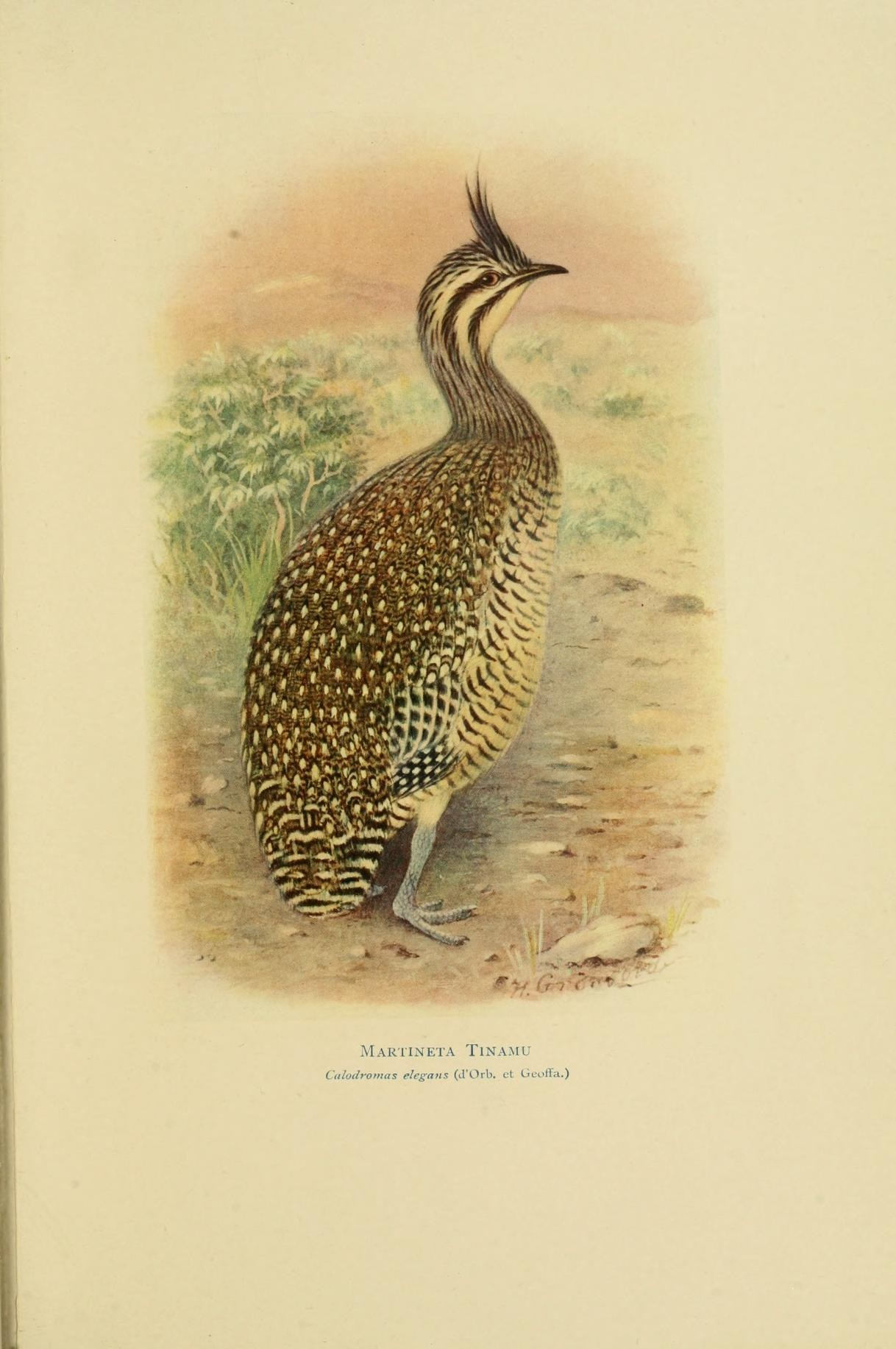
Birds of La Plata, by W. H. Hudson, with twenty-two coloured illustrations by H. Gronvold. Martineta Tinamu - Calodromas elegans (d'Orb. & Geoff.)

Although this species is heavily hunted for food and sport, the elegant crested tinamou is not uncommon and has a large range of 1,400,000 km^{2} (540,000 sq mi). It is evaluated as Least Concern of the IUCN Red List of Threatened Species. Their predators include skunks, foxes, wild cats, and raptors, such as the red-backed hawk.
