= Juan Bautista Ambrosetti =

Argentine archaeologist, ethnographer and naturalist

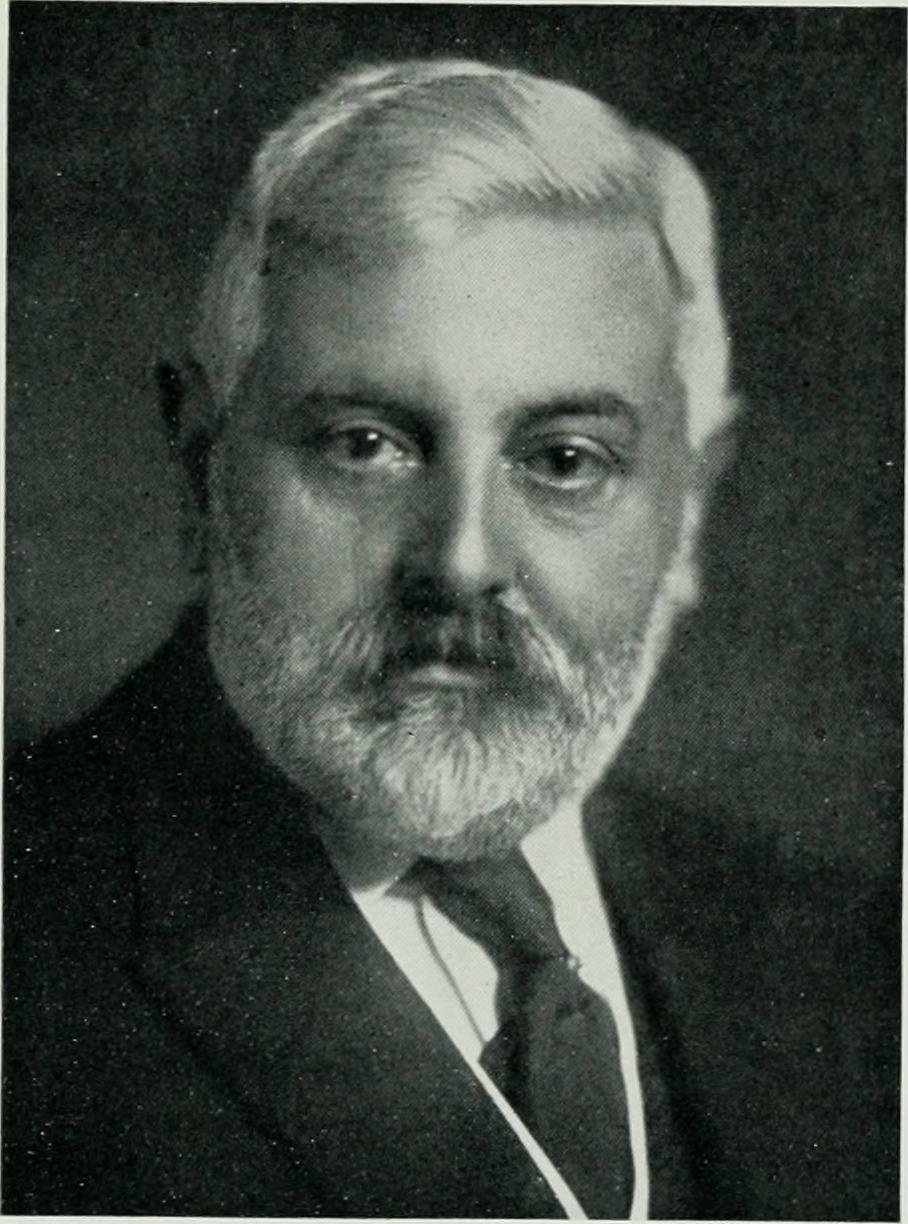
Juan Bautista Ambrosetti

Juan Bautista Ambrosetti (August 22, 1865 – May 28, 1917) was an Argentine archaeologist, ethnographer and naturalist who helped pioneer anthropology in his country.

== Life and work ==
Ambrosetti was born in Gualeguay, Entre Ríos Province, in 1865. He enrolled at the University of Buenos Aires, where he was mentored by the prominent local naturalist, Dr. Florentino Ameghino. At age twenty, he joined an expedition of naturalists into then-remote and largely uncharted Chaco Province, publishing his observations in Buenos Aires by a pseudonym, Tomás Bathata.

Following graduation, he was appointed Director of Zoology at the Provincial Museum of Entre Ríos, in Paraná. Ambrosetti's reputation in his field was first earned with his publication of studies on the ethnomusicology and cemeteries of the native peoples of Misiones Province, in 1893-95, and with The Megaliths of Tafí del Valle (1896). He collaborated with a number of local scientific institutions in subsequent years, including work for his alma mater's School of Philosophy and Letters, the Argentine Geographic Institute, the La Plata Museum, the Bernardino Rivadavia Natural Sciences Museum (where he collaborated with Ameghino), and the Buenos Aires Zoo (likewise led by a former teacher, Eduardo Ladislao Holmberg).

Ambrosetti contributed to a number of peer-reviewed journals, including the National Academy of Sciences Bulletin (Córdoba) and the National Agricultural Bulletin, contributing over 70 articles in all. He joined the Argentine Scientific Society and the Western Hemisphere Historical and Numismatic Association in 1901, representing Argentina at the 1902 Scientific Congress (in New York City), becoming the first Argentine to participate in the event. He was named Professor of Archaeology in 1903, and established the University of Buenos Aires Museum of Ethnography, in 1904. His text, Argentine Archaeology: Bronze in the Calchaquí Region (1904), would remain among the definitive texts on the subject.

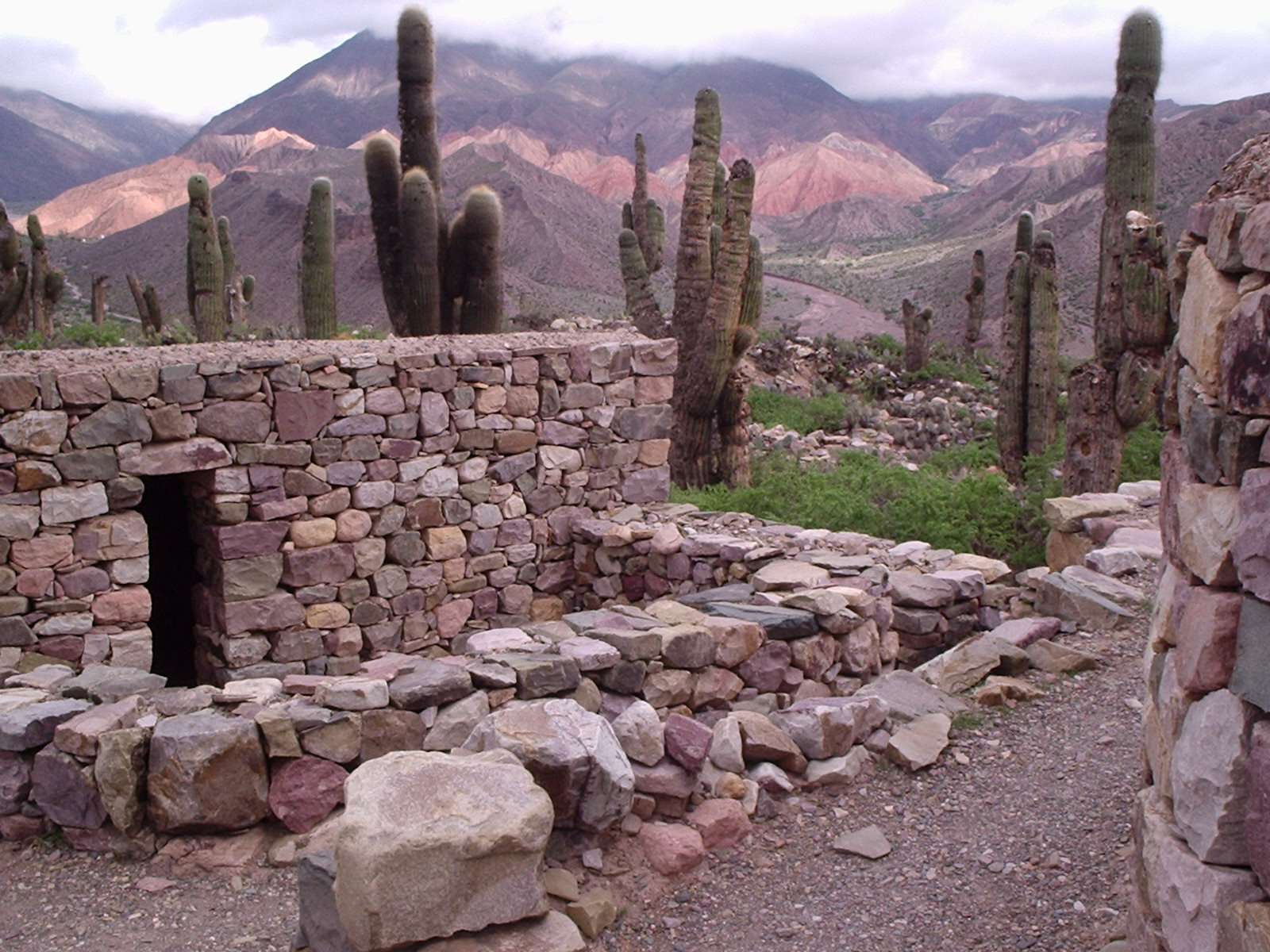
The Pucará de Tilcara ruins

His expeditions in the Argentine Northwest led Ambrosetti to the Quebrada de Humahuaca, a scenic gorge in Jujuy Province, where in 1908, he discovered the ruins of the Tilcara, an Omaguaca people long since vanished. Built on a strategic site as a fort along the storied Inca road system, the Pucará de Tilcara was estimated by Ambrosetti to have been established in the 11th century. The 15-hectare (38 acre) site included a necropolis, extensive petroglyphs, and thousands of archaeological pieces. Over the following three years, he and his team, recovered and catalogued over 3,000 artifacts, many of which were added to the Museum of Ethnography. The effort earned Ambrosetti a Doctorate honoris causa from his alma mater in 1910, following which he left responsibility for the project to his student, Salvador Debenedetti; the Quebrada de Humahuaca, including the ruins, was declared a UNESCO World Heritage Site in 2003.

== Later life and death ==
Ambrosetti continued to teach and write, and in 1917, published his only novel, Superstitions and Legends, which drew from his study of the carnival in the country's northeast region.

He died in Buenos Aires in 1917, and his ashes were buried at the foot of the Tilcara ruins.

== See also ==
- Ruins of Quilmes
