= Friedrich Schickendantz =

Argentine chemist, botanist, geologist & meteorologist (1837–1896)

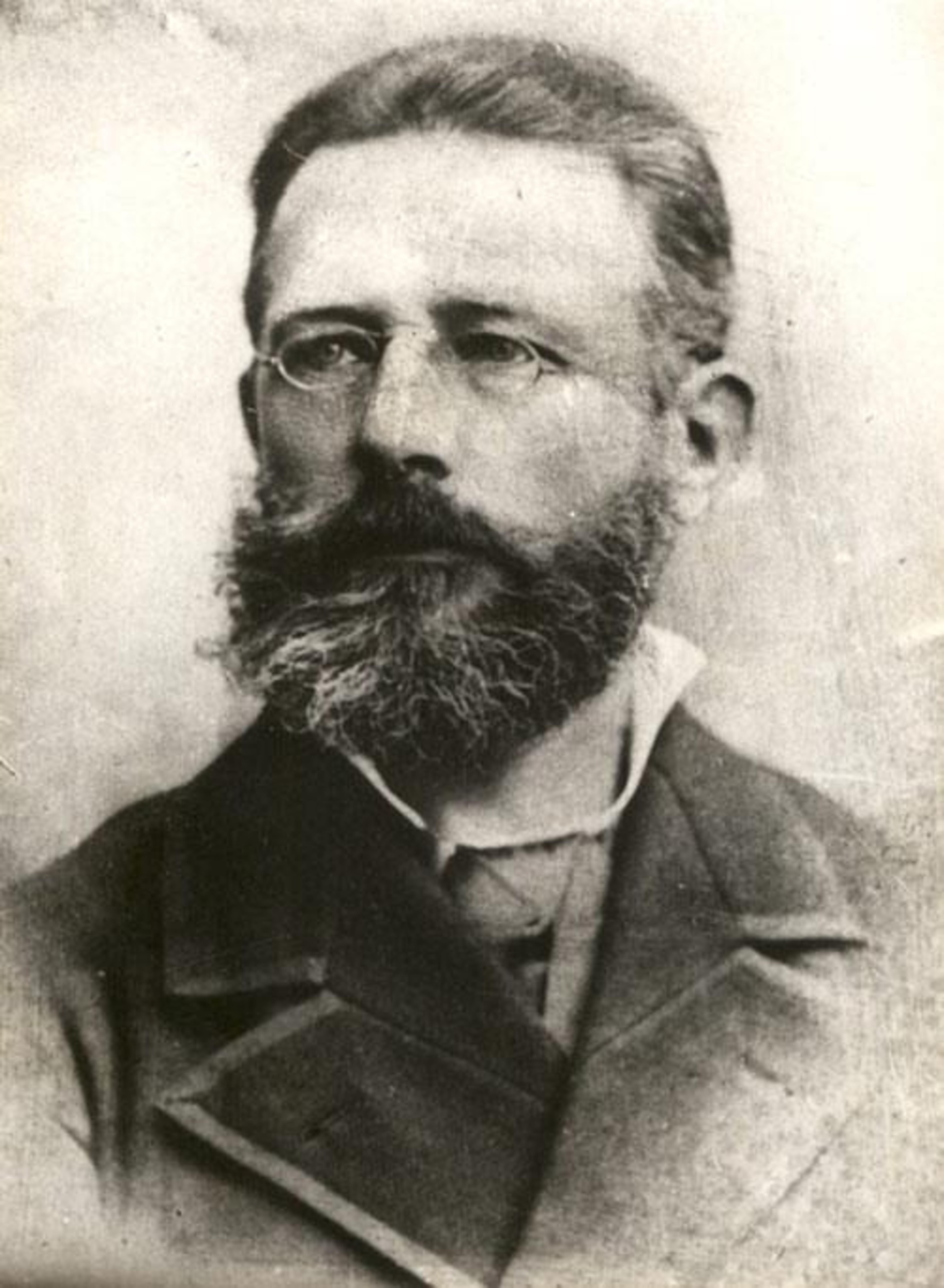
Friedrich Schickendantz

Friedrich Schickendantz (also known as Federico Schickendantz) (15 January 1837 – 4 April 1896) was a German naturalized Argentine scientist who worked in the fields of mineralogy, chemistry, botany, geology, and meteorology. He was born in Landau, now in the Rhineland-Palatinate state of Germany. He studied chemistry and mineralogy at the Ludwig-Maximilians-Universität München and Heidelberg University, under the direction of Robert Bunsen.

Schickendantz was one of the attendees of the 1860 Karlsruhe Congress. In 1861, while he was at Oxford, he decided to take a job at a mine in Pilciao, Andalgalá, in the Argentine province of Catamarca. The mine, called Casa Lafone, was owned by Samuel Fisher Lafone. Schickendantz worked at the mine until 1868; during this time he became a close friend of the supervisor of the mine, Samuel Lafone Quevedo, son of Fisher Lafone and developed what became known as the Schickendantz method for separating gold from copper.

Schickendantz also studied the plants in the region of Catamarca, many of which were still unknown in Europe. He made contributions to the study of alkaloids found in these plants, some of which eventually found therapeutic uses. Some species that were named after him include Gymnocalycium schickendantzii, Echinopsis schickendantzii, Trichocereus schickendantzii, Opuntia schickendantzii, Bulnesia schickendantzii, and Euphorbia schickendantzii.

Together with Lafone Quevedo, Shickendantz wrote a book titled Las Industrias de Catamarca (the industries of Catamarca), which dealt with agriculture, mining, and water conservation in the region.

From 1870 to 1870, he was director of the School of Agronomy, and lecturer of physics and chemistry at the Colegio Nacional. In 1881, he moved from Pilciao to the city of Catamarca, where he became rector of the Colegio Nacional and created a course on applied mineralogy. Later he moved to Tucumán, where he founded the Trinidad sugar mill. He then moved on to direct the chemistry office of the province, where he was a mentor to Miguel Lillo, who later became a renowned Argentine naturalist.

In 1892, Schickendantz moved to Buenos Aires, Argentina, where he taught at the Colegio Nacional, and was in charge of the chemistry section of the Museo de la Plata. He died in Buenos Aires in 1896.
