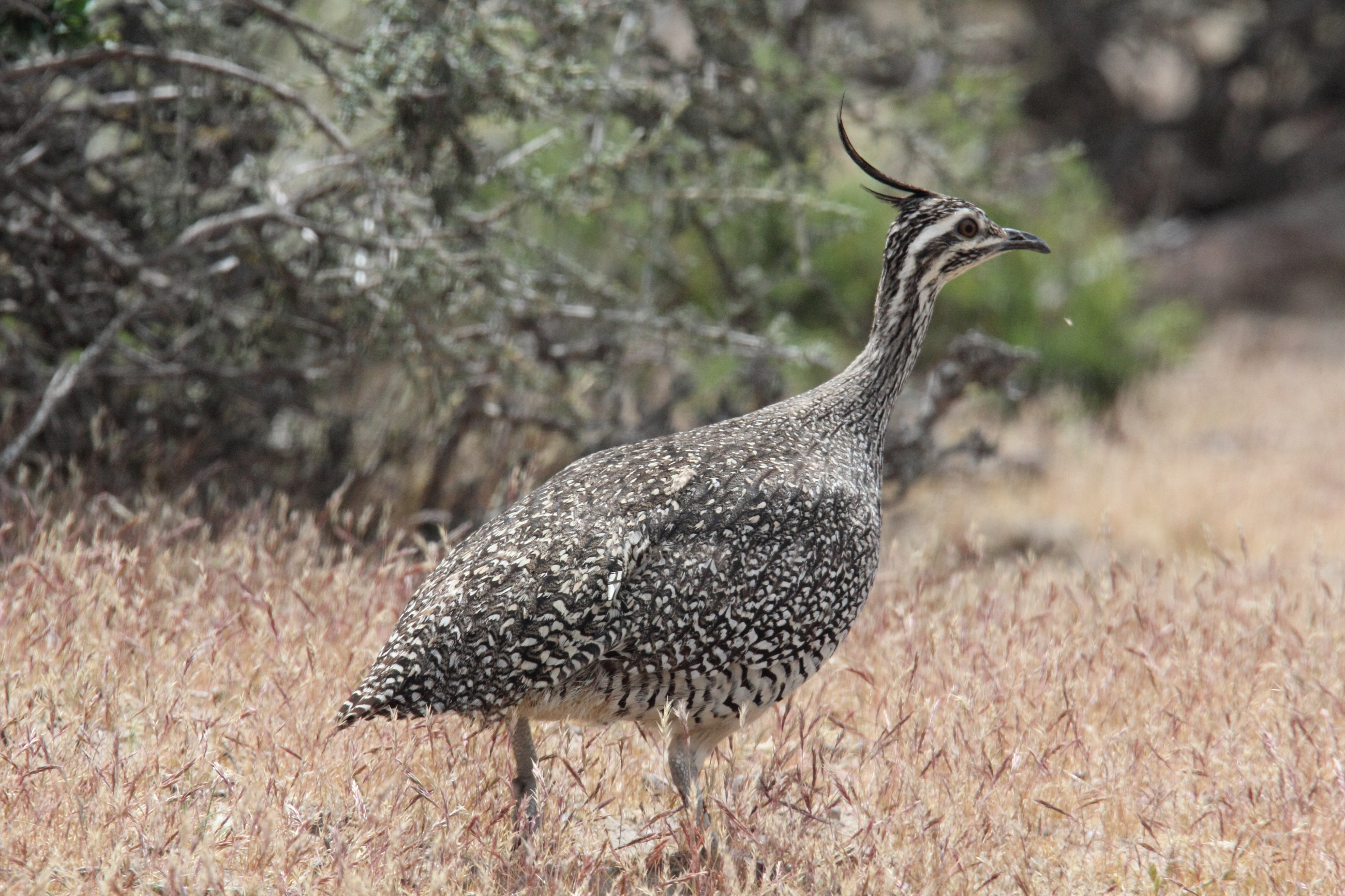
- Elegant crested tinamou (Eudromia elegans)

Scientific classification
- Kingdom: Animalia
- Phylum: Chordata
- Class: Aves
- Infraclass: Palaeognathae
- Order: Tinamiformes
- Family: Tinamidae
- Subfamily: Nothurinae
- Genus: Eudromia; I. Geoffroy Saint-Hilaire, 1832

Type species
- Eudromia elegans Geoffroy Saint-Hilaire, 1832

Species
- Eudromia elegans Elegant crested tinamou Eudromia formosa Quebracho crested tinamou

= Eudromia =

Genus of birds

Eudromia is a genus of birds in the tinamou family. This genus comprises two crested members of this South American family.

== Etymology ==
Eudromia comes from two Greek words, eu meaning "well" or "nicely", and dromos meaning "a running escape". These definitions refer to their habit of escaping predators by running.

== Taxonomy ==
Tinamous are paleognaths related to the flightless ratites. They are probably close in appearance to the flying ancestors of the ratites. Unlike other ratites, tinamous can fly, although in general, they are not strong fliers.

This genus has two species, and the elegant crested tinamou has diversified into a considerable number of subspecies. The species are:

=== Extant species ===
Genus Eudromia – I. Geoffroy Saint-Hilaire, 1832 – two species
Common name	Scientific name and subspecies	Range	Size and ecology	IUCN status and estimated population
Quebracho crested tinamou	Eudromia formosa (Lillo, 1905) Two subspecies: E. f. formosa located in northern Argentina; E. f. mira located in Paraguay and northwestern Argentina	Paraguay and northern Argentina	Size: Habitat: Diet:	LC
Elegant crested tinamou	Eudromia elegans Saint-Hilaire, 1832 Ten subspecies: E. e. elegans located in central Argentina; E. e. intermedia located in northwestern Argentina; E. e. magnistriata located in northwestern Argentina; E. e. riojana located in northwestern Argentina; E. e. albida located in western Argentina; E. e. multiguttata located in east central Argentina; E. e. devia located in southwestern Argentina; E. e. patagonica located in southern Argentina and southern Chile; E. e. numida located in central Argentina; E. e. wetmorei located in western Argentina	Argentina and southern Chile	Size: Habitat: Diet:	LC

=== Fossils ===
- †Eudromia sp. (Late Miocene of La Pampa Province, Argentina)
- †E. olsoni Tambussi & Tonni 1985 [Tinamisornis intermedius Dabbene & Lillo 1913 non Rovereto 1914; Eudromia elegans intermedia (Dabbene & Lillo 1913)] (Late Pliocene of Buenos Aires Province, Argentina)
- †E. intermedia (Rovereto 1914) [Tinamisornis intermedia Rovereto 1914 non Dabbene & Lillo 1913] (Pliocene of Argentina)

MPLK-03, a fossil specimen from Argentina, possibly belongs to Eudromia and surpasses the extinct E. elegans and E. formosa in size by 2.2–8% and 6–14%, respectively. It existed during the Late Pleistocene, around the time of the Last Glacial Maximum.
