= José Imbelloni =

Italian anthropologist

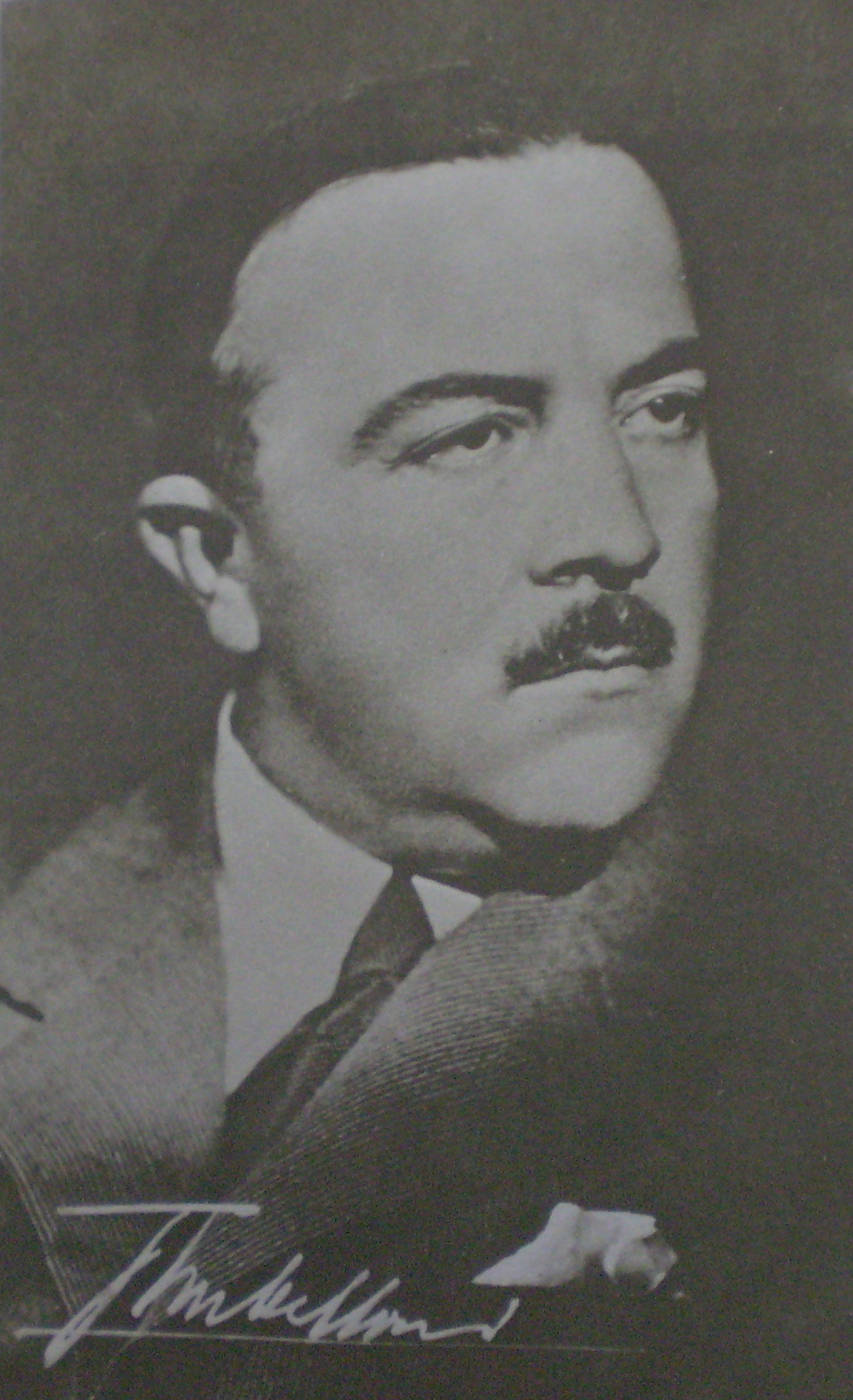
- José Imbelloni, ca. 50 years old
- Born: 1885; Lauria, Italy
- Died: 1967 (aged 81–82); Buenos Aires, Argentina
- Occupations: Naturalist, anthropologist
- Known for: Promoting South American Paleoanthropology

Giuseppe "José" Imbelloni (Lauria, 1885 – Buenos Aires, 1967) was an Italian naturalist and anthropologist known for his contributions to South American paleoanthropology.

== Education and career ==
Imbelloni initially pursued studies in medicine at the University of Perugia. Between 1908 and 1915, he resided in Argentina as a correspondent for an Italian newspaper. After returning to Italy, he pursued studies in natural sciences and anthropology at the University of Padua, where he earned his doctorate in Sciences in 1920.

In 1921, he returned to Argentina, where he secured the position of assistant professor of anthropology at the Faculty of Philosophy and Letters, University of Buenos Aires, marking the beginning of a lifelong association with the institution. By 1933, he had become a Full Professor of Anthropology and General Ethnography. Later, he held the position of Full Professor of Ancient History at the National University of the Littoral.

Imbelloni's work focused on the issues of Argentine Paleoethnology, leading to publications such as Habitantes neolíticos del Lake Buenos Aires' at the behest of the La Plata Museum. He also conducted studies on artificial skull deformations, proposing that various hypotheses could be reconciled through coordination with Anthropology, Ethnography, and Linguistics.

== Honors ==
Due to his prestige, Imbelloni was appointed as the Director of the Institute of Anthropology at the Juan B. Ambrosetti Museum of Ethnography by the National Government in 1947. He was a member of the National Academy of History of Argentina and directed the initial editions of the magazine Runa.

Imbelloni played a significant role in organizing anthropology studies in Argentina and received numerous awards and honors, including:

- Eduardo C. Holmberg Award, National Academy of Exact, Physical, and Natural Sciences
- Gold Medal, Congress of Americanists, Mar del Plata, 1967

In his work, he defended the theory of demographic contributions from Southeast Asia to the peopling of America. He studied seven different immigrant population groups from various times and through different penetration routes, publishing works such as La esfinge indiana (1926) and El Poblamiento primitivo de América (1943).

== Publications ==
Imbelloni was a prolific communicator, maintaining close contact with the general public through numerous articles in the national press, including his weekly column in the newspaper La Prensa. Some of his other works include:

- Introducción a nuevos estudios de cráneotrigonometría (1921)
- Filología de los "Equidae" (1926)
- Nota sobre los supuestos descubrimientos del doctor J. G. Wolff, en Patagonia (1923)
- Deformaciones intencionales del cráneo en Sudamérica (1925)
- Estudios de morfología exacta (parte III): deformaciones intencionales del cráneo en Sud América (1925)
- El idioma de los Incas del Perú en el grupo lingüístico melanesio – polinesio (1926)
- Los moluscos y las antiguas migraciones de pueblos mediterráneos hacia América según la escuela de Mánchester: estudio crítico (1926)
- La esfinge indiana: antiguos y nuevos aspectos del problema de los orígenes americanos (1926)
- El libro de las Atlántidas (1943)

== Trivia ==
In 1950, Imbelloni wrote the prologue for the book Toponimia patagónica de etimología araucana by Argentine President Juan Domingo Perón.

== See also ==
- Interpretation of the Rongorongo tablets of Easter Island
