= Salvador Debenedetti =

Argentine archaeologist, anthropologist and educator

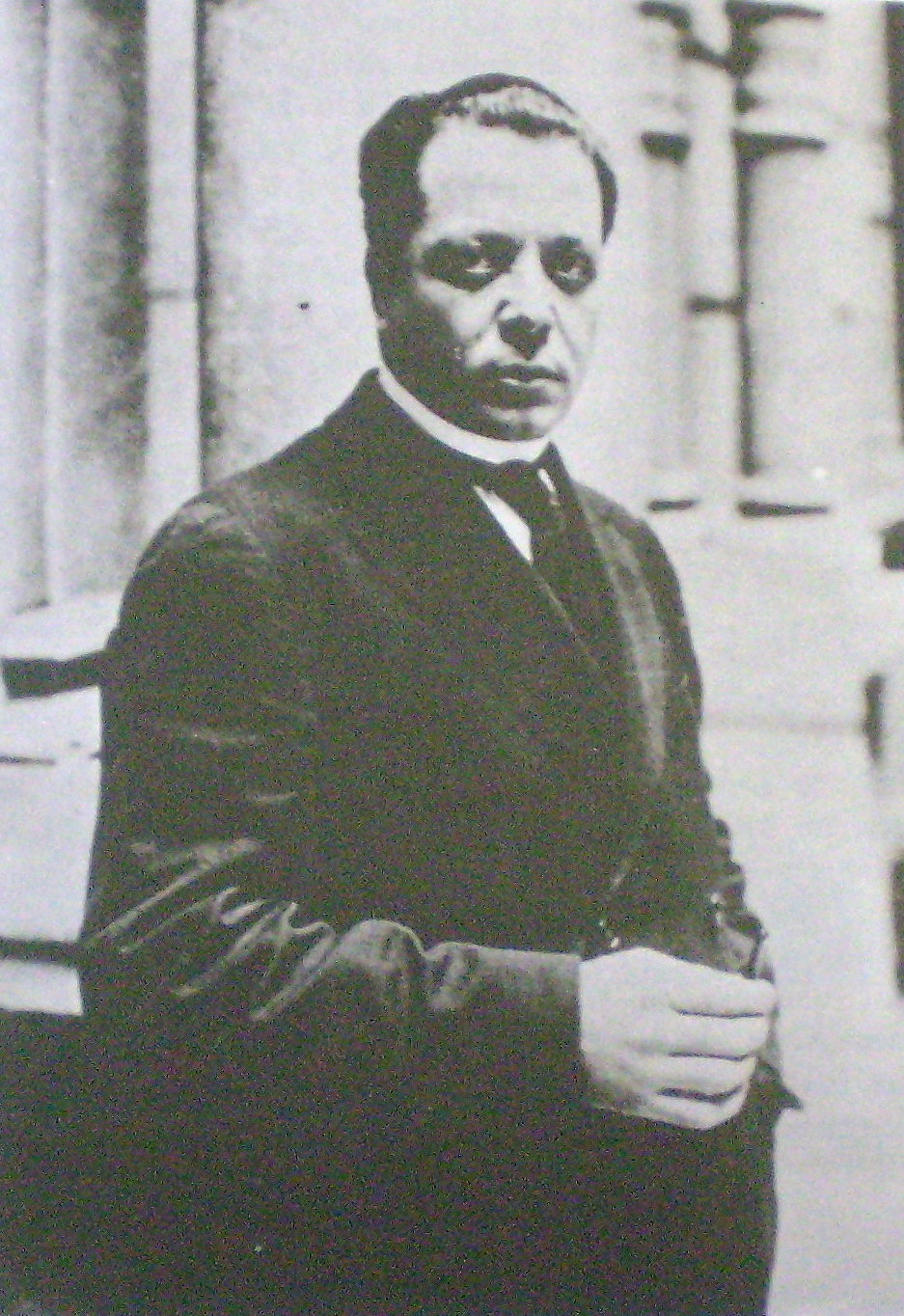
Salvador Debenedetti

Salvador Santiago Lorenzo Debenedetti (March 2, 1884 – September 30, 1930) was an Argentine archaeologist, anthropologist and educator. He was involved in the restoration of Pucará de Tilcara, an ancient fortification in what today is Jujuy Province. He was also the originator of Student's Day in Argentina, an informal holiday celebrated on September 21.

== Biography ==
He was born to Lucia Amoretti and Bernardo Debenedetti, a soft drink manufacturer, in the southern Buenos Aires suburb of Avellaneda, in Argentina's Buenos Aires Province. Debenedetti attended secondary school at the San José Academy, and enrolled at the University of Buenos Aires School of Letters, where he became a protégé of Professor Juan Bautista Ambrosetti. Elected president of the student body in 1902, Debenedetti persuaded the school's regents to adopt a Student's Day. He later earned a Doctor of Philosophy and Letters in 1909, as succeeded his mentor as both curator of the Pucará de Tilcara ruins, and of the university's Museum of Ethnography.

He was invited to join the International Congress of Americanists, as Ambrosetti had been, during the group's 1929 symposium in Paris. Upon his death in 1930, his ashes were buried alongside Ambrosetti's at the foot of the Tilcara ruins.
