= Ruins of Quilmes =

Archaeological site in Argentina

Coordinates: 26°27′50″S 66°02′17″W

The Ruins of Quilmes is an archaeological site in the Calchaquí Valleys, Tucumán Province, Argentina. The site was the largest pre-Columbian settlement in the country, occupying about 30 hectares. The area dates back to c. 850 AD and was inhabited by the Quilmes people; it is believed that about 5,000 people lived here during its heights.

Although discovered in 1888 by Samuel Alejandro Lafone Quevedo, the ruins were first studied in 1897 by the archaeologist Juan Bautista Ambrosetti.

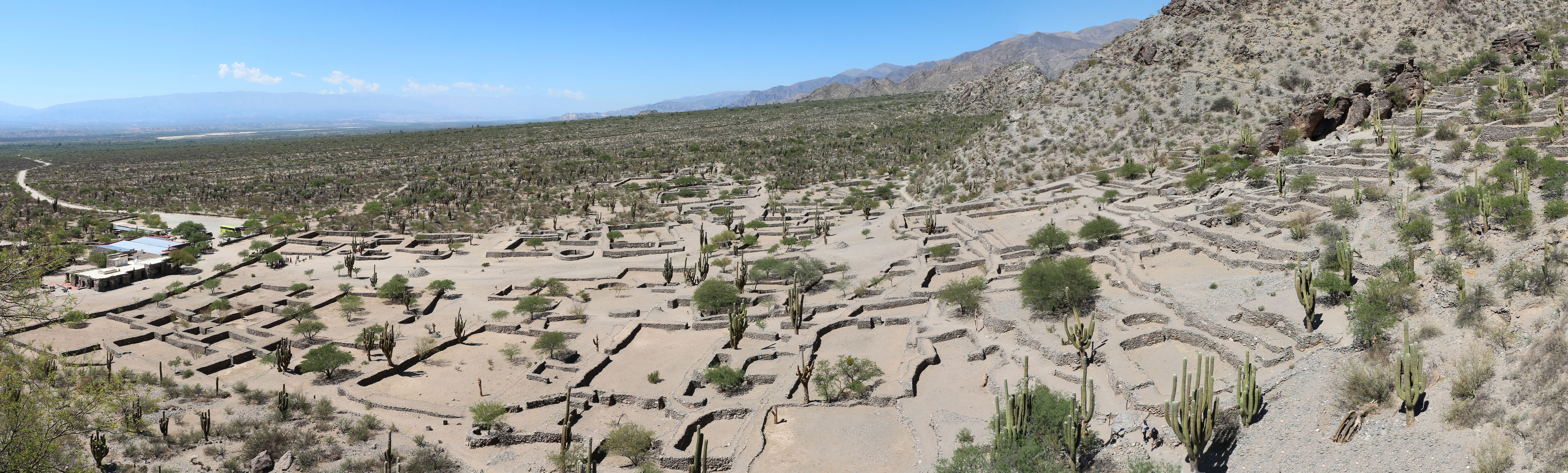
Ruins of Quilmes
