= Los Juríes =

Coordinates: 28°28′S 62°06′W

- Municipality and village
- Interactive map of Los Juríes
- Country: Argentina
- Province: Santiago del Estero Province
- Time zone: UTC−3 (ART)

Los Juríes is a municipality and village in Santiago del Estero Province in Argentina.
