= Pucará de Tilcara =

Archaeological site in Argentina

Coordinates: 23°35′19″S 65°24′10″W

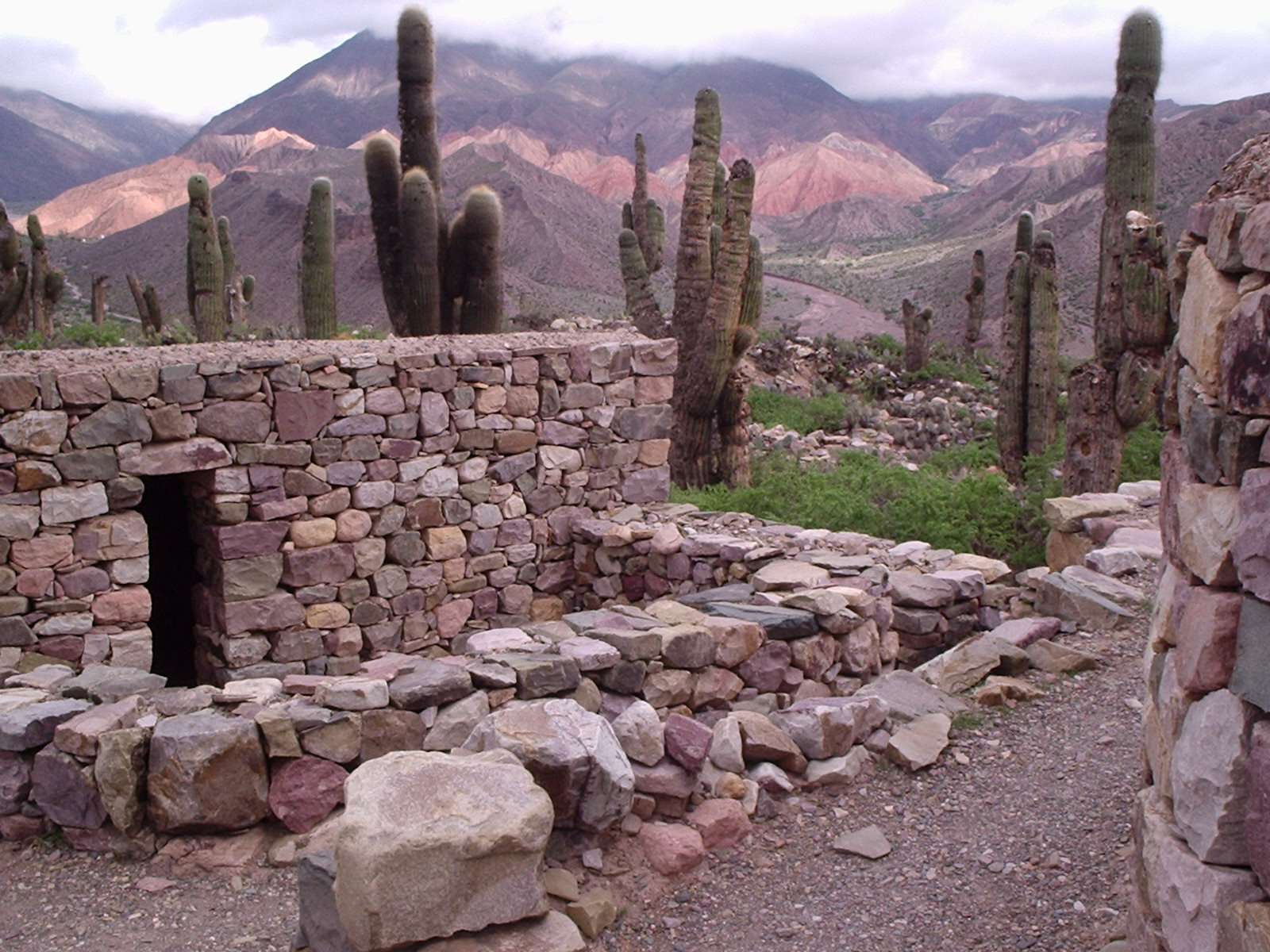
Ruins of the Pucará de Tilcara

The Pucará de Tilcara is a pre-Inca fortification or pukara located on a hill just outside (approximately a 15-minute walk) the small town of Tilcara, in the Argentine province of Jujuy. The location was strategically chosen to be easily defensible and to provide good views over a long stretch of the Quebrada de Humahuaca.

The Pucará de Tilcara was declared a National Monument in 2000. It has been partially rebuilt, and is the only publicly accessible archaeological site in the Quebrada de Humahuaca.

== History ==
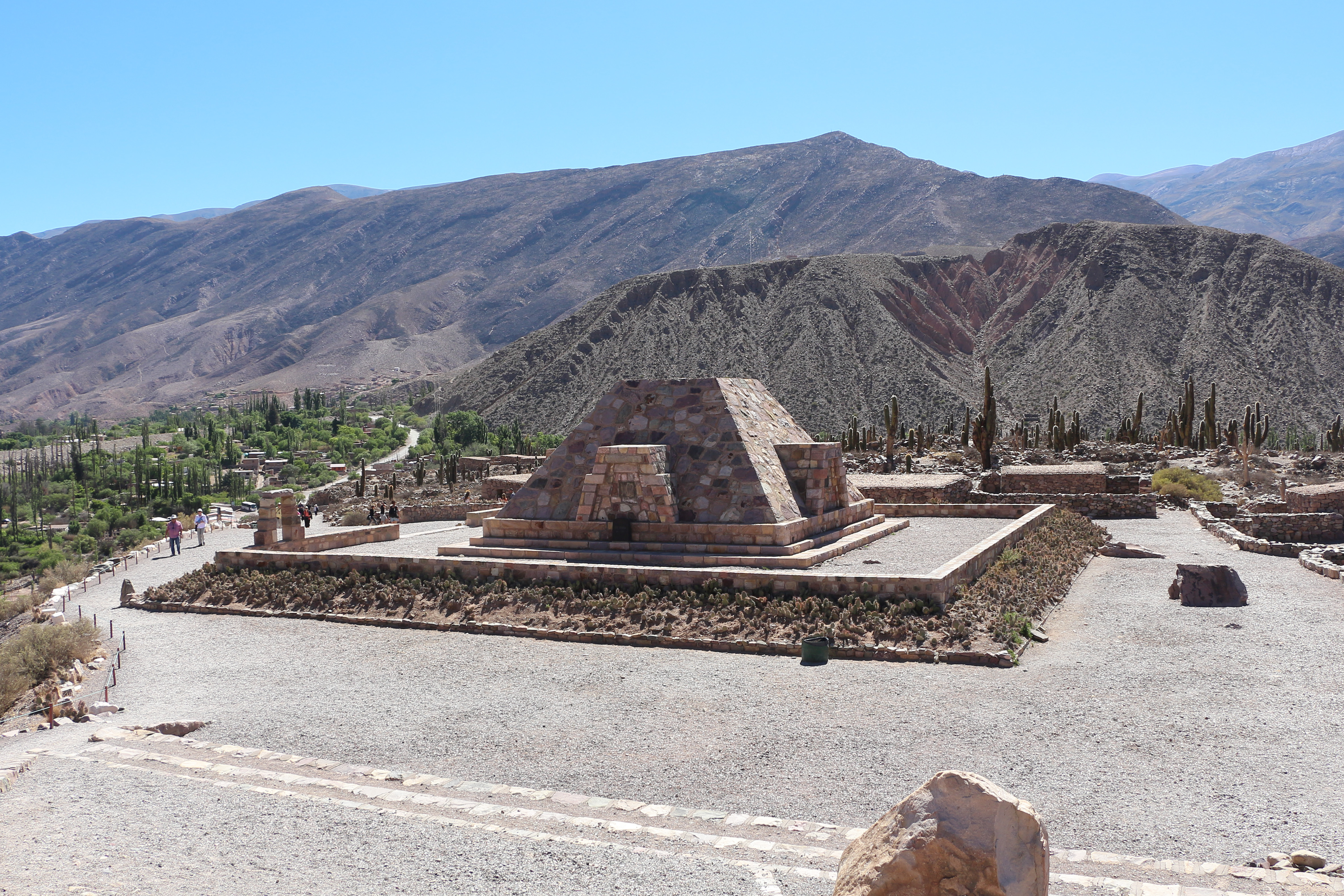
Pucará de Tilcara

Traces of human habitation in the area date back more than 10,000 years. The fortified town was originally built by the Omaguaca tribe, who settled in the area around the 12th century. Experts in agriculture, weaving and pottery, they were also renowned warriors. During their time, the pucará served as an important administrative and military center.

At its peak, the pucará covered up to about 15 acres (61,000 m^{2}) and housed over 2,000 inhabitants, living in small square stone buildings with low doorways and no windows. Besides living quarters, the pucará contained corrals for animals, sites to perform religious ceremonies and burial sites.

In the late 15th century, the tribes of the Quebrada were finally conquered by the Incas under Tupac Inca Yupanqui, who used the pucará as a military outpost and to secure the supply of metals such as silver, zinc, and copper which were mined nearby.

The Incan domination of the area only lasted for about half a century, and ended with the arrival of the Spanish in 1536, who founded the modern town of Tilcara in 1586.

== Recent history ==
=== Rediscovery ===
In 1908, the ethnographer Juan Bautista Ambrosetti of the University of Buenos Aires and his student Salvador Debenedetti rediscovered the site and catalogued over 3,000 artifacts during their first three years of digging. Starting in 1911 they began to clear about 2,000 square metres (22,000 sq ft) and rebuild some of the structures. In 1948 Eduardo Casanova took over and oversaw the opening of the site as an archaeological museum in 1966. Excavation and rebuilding efforts are still governed by the University of Buenos Aires.

=== Museum ===
The museum contains ten rooms, three of which are for temporary exhibitions, a library and administrative offices. The seven permanent rooms display over 5,000 valuable historical pieces from various Indian cultures. Among the most valuable is a mummified body discovered fully clothed in an excellent state of preservation in the Atacama Desert. However, this is no longer being exhibited.

- Room 1 is for Argentina and the neighboring countries of Chile and Bolivia, and includes inter alia the mummified body from San Pedro de Atacama (no longer exhibited).
- Room 2 deals with the Indian culture of Peru and displays ceramics of the Nazca, Mochica and Chimú Indians.
- Room 3 displays items from the time of the Spanish Conquest.
- Rooms 4 and 5 display items from Puna and Jujuy, including an important reconstruction of a burial ground of the Aymara Indians.
- Room 6 displays pieces from the ancient fortification of Pucará de Tilcara itself.
- Room 7 displays further pieces from the Quebrada de Humahuaca.

=== Botanical garden ===
A small botanical garden with cactus species native to the area, located next to the pucará, is also worth visiting.

There is a commemorative plaque displaced that reads "The text on this plaque reflects the conception dominant for much of the 20th century in Argentina, that the majority of indigenous peoples had disappeared with the Spanish conquest and colonization. This led to the idea that archeology should 'salvage' the ashes of a 'dead' culture. The voices and struggles of indigenous groups have shown those ideas to be false. Thus, Article 75, Clause 17 of the 1994 reformed National Constitution recognizes the 'cultural and ethnic pre-existence of Argentinian indigenous peoples.' Today, archeology offers another tool to nourish the memory of these peoples".
