= Pedro Bohórquez =

Spanish adventurer

Pedro Chamijo (1602 in Granada, Spain – January 3, 1667 in Lima, Peru), more commonly known as Pedro Bohórquez (or Bohorques) or Inca Hualpa, was a Spanish adventurer in the Viceroyalty of Peru. He was probably born in Spain, but some sources say he was born in Quito. After trying to make his fortune in various schemes in Peru, around 1656 he had himself crowned Inca (emperor) of the Calchaquíes Indians, fooling not only the Indians but also Spanish government and clerical officials. His almost legendary story is an example of the picaresque, with a tragic ending.

== Early life ==
Of campesino origin, he was probably a Morisco (Iberian Muslim converted to Christianity) or Mudéjar (Iberian Muslim not converted to Christianity). He came from a poor background. He learned to read and write studying with the Jesuits in Cádiz.

== Peru ==
He embarked from Spain for America at the age of 18, attracted by the promise of easy riches that the New World seemed to offer. Shortly after arriving, he married a woman of mestizo descent. He lived for about 15 years with her family. After his father-in-law died, he travelled extensively throughout Peru, learning about Incan ways and mastering the Quechuan language.

He married an Andean chieftain's daughter.

He tried various schemes over many years in Peru, but without making the fortune he sought.

In Upper Peru near Potosí he met a priest named Bohórquez. The two became friends. In order to evade the Spanish authorities, Chamijo adopted Bohórquez's last name.

Around 1656 he arrived at San Miguel de Tucumán in what is now Argentina. This city was one of the principal cities of a province that included the present-day provinces of Jujuy, Salta, Catamarca, La Rioja, Tucumán, Santiago del Estero, Córdoba and the western parts of Chaco and Formosa.

This was a vast territory, but the situation of the Spanish colonists was precarious, partly because of the opposition of the native Calchaquíes, a warlike people of the Diaguita or Pazioca confederation who had been briefly subjugated to the Inca Empire. They now vehemently opposed the Spanish presence. Attempts by the Jesuits to evangelize them had not been fruitful; methods that had been successful with other Indigenous groups in the region were unsuccessful with the Calchaquíes.

By 1656 a vague rumor was circulating that the Calchaquíes knew the location of prodigious amounts of precious metals hidden during the decline of the Inca Empire.

It is not known how Bohórquez learned of this situation. He was of a brownish complexion and by now was married to a young Indigenous woman. He was also said to speak fluent Quechua. With these advantages, he was able to convince the Calchaquíes that he was the last descendant of the Inca emperors and that his name was Inca Hualpa. Probably the Calchaquíes didn't believe his story — they did not wish to be subjected to the Incas any more than to the Spanish — but the appearance of "Inca Hualpa" might free them from the Spanish yoke.

Bohórquez assured his new subjects that if they revealed the location of the hidden Inca treasure to him, he would do everything in his power to expel the Spanish. Simultaneously, he assured the Spanish that, as he was considered emperor by the Indigenous, he would be able to obtain their submission to the Spanish king and reveal the location of the treasure, if only the Spanish would guarantee his recognition as a local monarch. He also convinced the Jesuits that as a Christian monarch, he would be able to obtain the conversion of his subjects.

The governor of Tucumán, Alonso Mercado y Villacorta, met with Bohórquez in June 1657 in Belén, Catamarca. He agreed to give him the title of captain general and celebrated a week of festivities in his honor. The only opposition came from the bishop of Tucumán, Fray Melchor de Maldonado y Saavedra, who was suspicious of his story. Nevertheless, Bohórquez was able to maintain his position for two years, during which time he instituted a strong government and fortified the valleys against the Spanish.

When this was discovered, he led the third rising of the Calchaquíes against the Spanish, attacking the cities of Salta and San Miguel de Tucumán and causing serious losses there. Finally, he was defeated by forces of Governor Mercado, but without being taken prisoner immediately.

When he was arrested, he was pardoned by the viceroy of Peru, Baltasar de la Cueva Enríquez. However bad luck or the intrigues of his enemies revealed another plan to lead another revolt of the Calchaquíes. He was garrotted in Lima on January 3, 1667, and his head was exhibited on a pike. As for the Indigenous, the survivors were divided, distributed to encomiendas for forced labor. Some were removed from their mountain valleys and transported to distant places. The Quilmes were transported to Buenos Aires, where a town still bears that name.

His story was related by Padre Hernando de Torreblanca, a Jesuit who had believed in Inca Hualpa, in Relación histórica de Calchaquí (1696). Roberto J. Payró published a novel in 1905, El falso inca.
