= Miguel Lillo =

Argentine naturalist and professor (1862–1931)

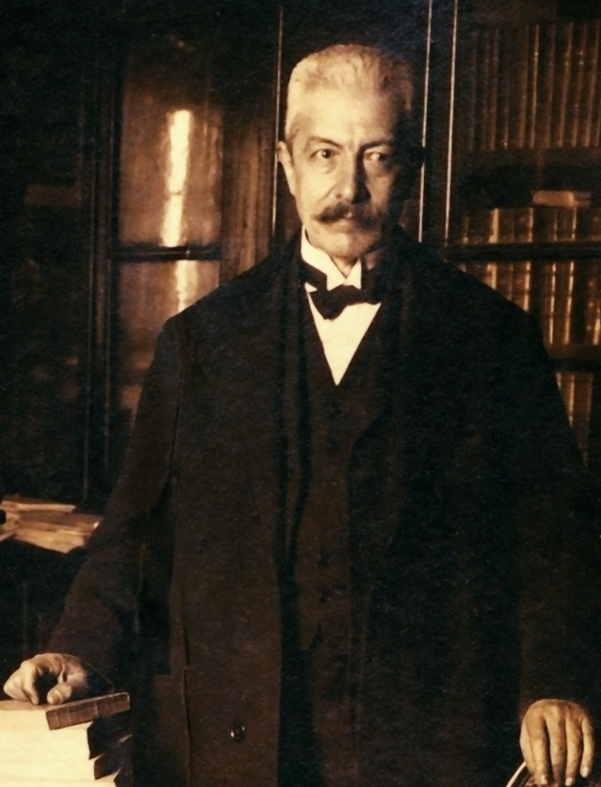
- Born: Miguel Ignacio Lillo; July 26, 1862; Tucumán
- Died: May 4, 1931 (aged 68); Tucumán
- Awards: Francisco Moreno Prize, 1928; Doctor Honoris Causa
- Scientific career
- Fields: botany, zoology
- Author abbrev. (botany): Lillo
- Author abbrev. (zoology): Lillo

Miguel Ignacio Lillo (26 July 1862 – 4 May 1931) was an Argentine naturalist and professor.

== Early life and education ==
Born in the city of San Miguel de Tucuman on 26 July 1862, Lillo was related to Lastenia Blanco, and journalist, Emilio J. Schleh. Miguel Lillo studied at the National School of Tucumán, graduating in 1881, but could not afford to continue formal university studies.

== Career ==
Lillo was passionately devoted to various scientific studies, especially those pertaining to nature. After his formal education, he continued working as an assistant pharmacist in the Physics and Chemistry laboratories of the National College. By 1883, he had amassed a collection of plants from his local area comprising 700 specimens. He went to the National University of Córdoba for guidance from Federico Kurtz and the brothers, Oscar and Adolfo Döring and from whom he gained an appreciation of classification.

In 1888 he published an interesting essay on the plants of Tucumán. Shortly after he was appointed assistant and student of Friedrich Schickendantz, chemist and director of the Municipal Chemical office of Tucumán; a post to which Lillo succeeded in 1892. In 1905, he published Fauna Tucumana, Aves (Fauna of Tucumán, Birds) containing their discoveries of new species; at that time already he had the largest collection of birds of his province. In 1914, the National University of La Plata awarded Lillo the title of Doctor Honoris Causa. After teaching chemistry and physics in the National School and the Normal school, from 1914 he lectured at the National University of Tucumán.

He was appointed director of the Museum of Natural History at the University of Tucumán and member of the National Commission of Argentina flora.

In 1918, he retired from teaching, but maintained the honorary position of director of the Museum of Natural History at the University of Tucumán.

In December 1930, and shortly before his death, he donated all his property to the National University of Tucumán; this consisted of extensive grounds, a considerable sum of money, an extensive library and his zoological and herbarium collections consisting of more than 20,000 specimens of 6,000 different species. With this donation the National University of Tucumán established the Miguel Lillo Foundation in 1933.

Miguel Lillo died in the city of San Miguel de Tucumán on May 4, 1931.

== Activities ==
Miguel Lillo was an amateur naturalist: extremely shrewd and observant; erudite and gifted with an extraordinary scientific vocation. He specialised in botany, but also pursued other branches of science, including chemistry and zoology.

He was dedicated to scientific research alternating with teaching. He made a notable contribution to the knowledge of the trees of Argentina and the botanical family of Compositae. He was also a keen ornithologist, a discipline in which he also became an authority. His interests extended beyond sciences to language, studying both classical literature and indigenous languages.

He was a competent phytogeographer. Expeditions undertaken between 1885 and 1916 familiarised him with the province of Tucumán. He also toured much of Argentina, from Buenos Aires to the north, expeditions to the provinces of Córdoba and Santiago del Estero in 1885, to Cuyo between 1890 and 1891, Buenos Aires and Santa Fe from 1891 to 1902, to the province of Salta in 1894 and into Chile in 1895. Other expeditions included Formosa, Chaco and Mesopotamia, Argentina, including Martín García Island.

== Selected publications ==
- Notas ornitológicas [Ornithological notes] (in Spanish).
- Lillo, Miguel; Schickendatz, F., Sobre la determinación de la glucosa en los vinos y en los productos de la industria azucarera [On the determination of glucose in wines and products of the sugar industry] (in Spanish)
- Flora de la provincia de Tucumán [Flora of the province of Tucumán] (in Spanish). 1888.
- Sobre la existencia de una especie de heliocarpo en la Argentina (Tucumán y el Interior de Córdoba) [Whether there is a kind of heliocarpo in Argentina (Tucumán and Cordoba Interior)] (in Spanish), 1888
- Flores de Tucumán, herbario de M.Lillo [Flora of Tucumán, herbarium of M.Lillo] (in Spanish) (Exposition Universelle (1889), Paris
- Enumeración y descripción de las especies de animales indígenas con sus costumbres, daños y beneficios que ocasionan, más sus características [List and description of species of indigenous animals with their customs, causing damage and benefits plus their characteristics] (in Spanish), 1889
- El cultivo del ramio en Tucumán [The cultivation of Ramie in Tucumán] (in Spanish)
- "Enumeración sistemática de las aves de la provincia de Tucumán" [Systematic enumeration of birds in the province of Tucumán]. Annals of the National Museum of Buenos Aires (in Spanish). 3 (VIII). 1902.
- Fauna Tucumana. Aves [Tucumana wildlife. Birds] (in Spanish). Tucumán: Revista de Letras y Ciencias Sociales. 1905.
- Contribución al conocimiento de los árboles de la República Argentina [Contribution to the knowledge of trees in Argentina] (in Spanish), 1910
- "Descripción de plantas nuevas pertenecientes a la Flora Argentina" [Description of new plants belonging to the Argentina Flora (Ilex prunus, Blepharocalyx)]. Anales de la Sociedad Científica Argentina (in Spanish). LXXII. 1911.
- Lillo, Miguel; Dabbene, Roberto (1913), "Description de deux nouvelles espèces d'oiseaux de la République Argentina" [Description of two new species of birds of Argentina], Proceedings of the National Museum of Natural History, Buenos Aires (in French), XXIV
- "Las Asclepidáceas de la República Argentina" [The Asclepidáceas of the Argentine Republic], Review of University Studies, Tucumán (in Spanish), 1924
- "Un cambio curioso de sexualidad" [A curious change of sexuality]. Ed. Darwiniana (in Spanish). 1924.

== Honours ==
- Francisco Moreno Prize, 1928

=== Eponyms ===
- Faculty of Natural Sciences and Miguel Lillo Institute: one of the academic units of the National University of Tucumán
- "Miguel Lillo Institute" and "Foundation Miguel Lillo"
- "Barrio Miguel Lillo" San Miguel de Tucumán
- Miguel Lillo Park, Necochea, a public maritime forest nature reserve established in 1979.

=== Genera ===
- (Araceae) Lilloa Speg.

Some 113 species, including

- (Acanthaceae) Chaetochlamys lilloi J.L.Lotti
- (Acanthaceae) Justicia lilloi (Lotti) C.Ezcurra
- (Pteridaceae) Notholaena lilloi Hicken
- (Asclepiadaceae) Matelea lilloana (T.Mey.) Pontiroli
- (Balanophoraceae) Juelia lilloana Sleumer
- (Fabaceae) Lupinus lilloanus C.P.Sm.
- (Fabaceae) Desmodium lilloanum (Schindl.) Burkart
