= Juan B. Ambrosetti Museum of Ethnography =

Museum in Argentina

Coordinates: 34°36′41″S 58°22′16″W

Museo Etnográfico Juan B. Ambrosetti
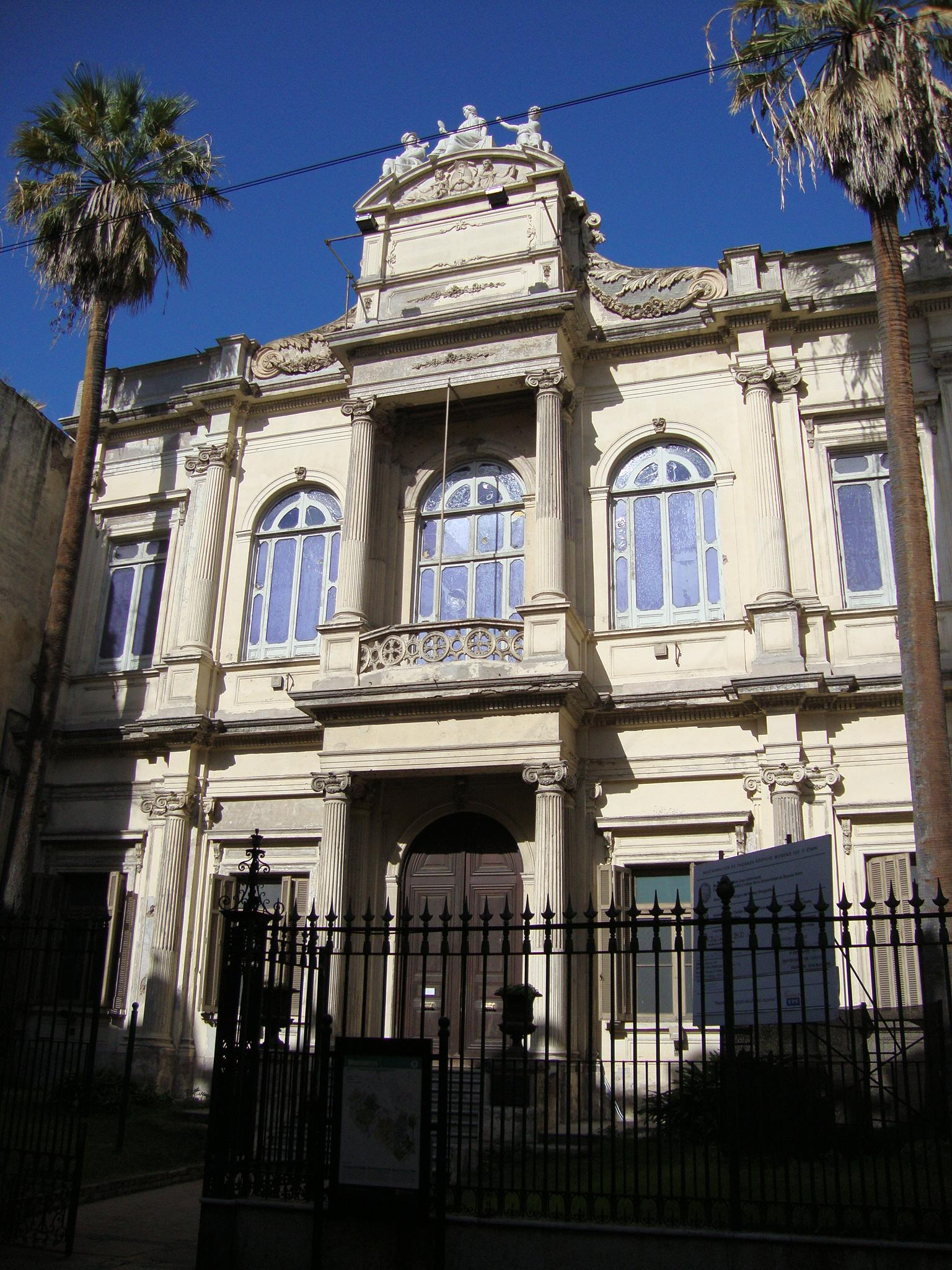
- Established: 1904
- Location: 350 Moreno Street; Buenos Aires, Argentina
- Director: Mónica Berón
- Website: www.museoetnografico.filo.uba.ar

The Juan B. Ambrosetti Museum of Ethnography (Spanish: Museo Etnográfico "Juan B. Ambrosetti") is an Argentine museum overseen by the University of Buenos Aires Faculty of Philosophy and Letters and located in Buenos Aires.

== Overview ==
An estate on an eight-hectare (20 acre) property in Buenos Aires' Nueva Pompeya ward became the site of a homemade museum in 1866, when 14-year-old Francisco Moreno and his father classified and mounted their extensive collection of fossils and artifacts, gathered in excursions along the property and surroundings. The younger Moreno organized his collection as a public display, and with funding from the Province of Buenos Aires, inaugurated the Anthropology and Ethnography Museum of Buenos Aires in 1879.

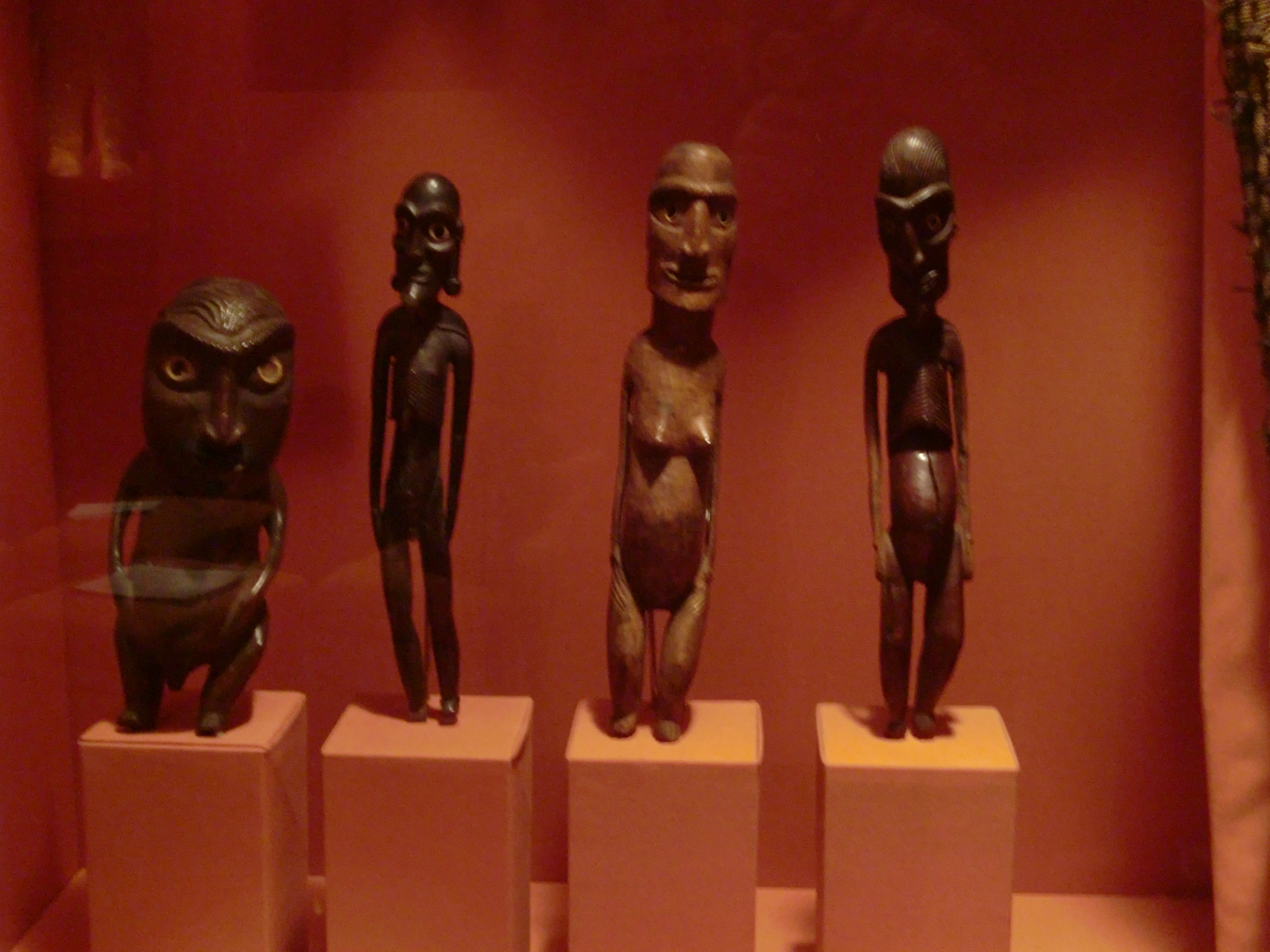
Moai Kavakava, from Easter Island.

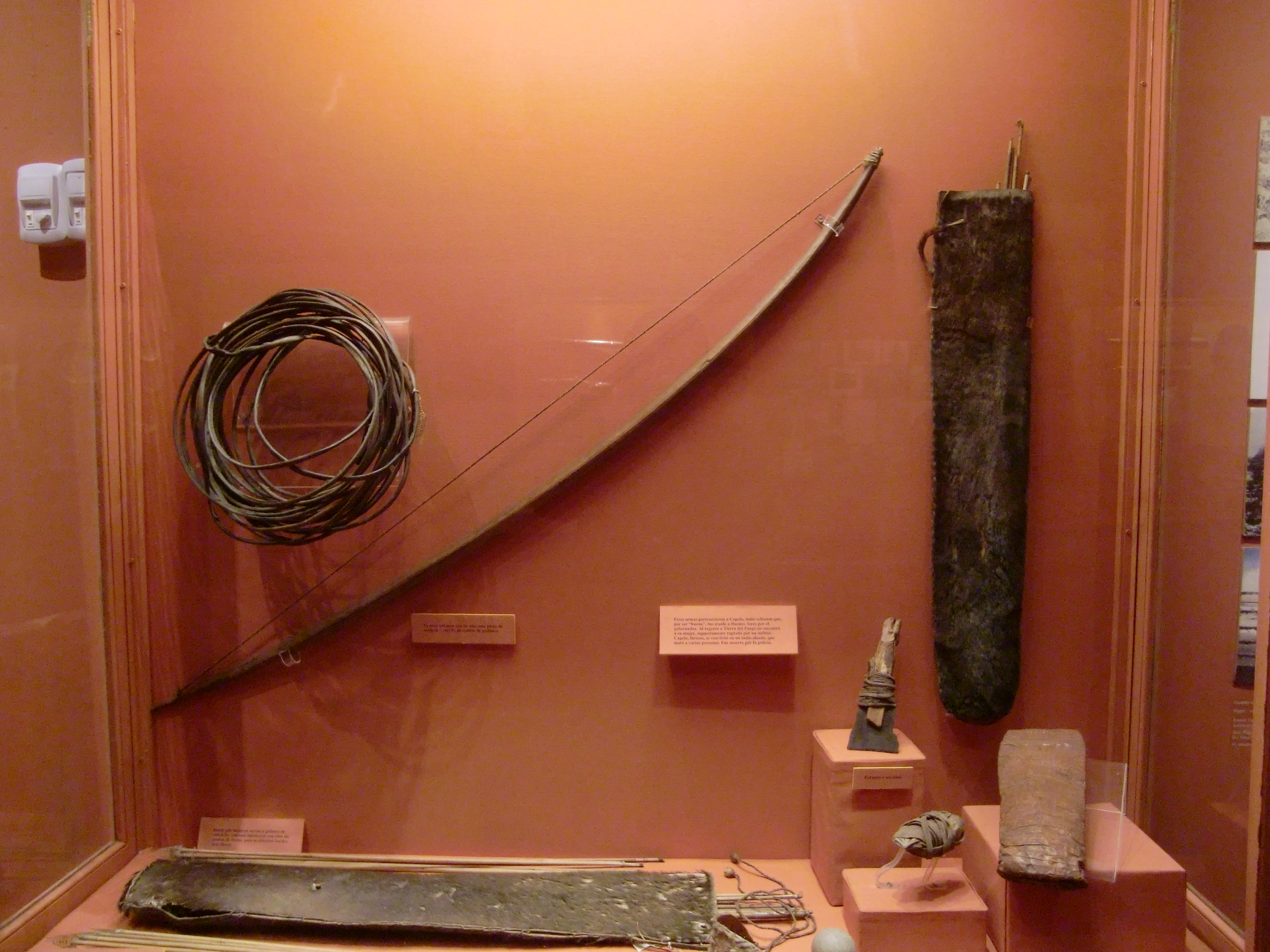
Bow and tools of the Selkʼnam people (Tierra del Fuego)

Featuring over 15,000 artifacts, the collection was ultimately transferred to the new La Plata Museum in 1888. Explorations in the Gran Chaco region conducted at the time by University of Buenos Aires naturalist Juan Bautista Ambrosetti led to an extensive, new collection, however, and in 1904, the latter inaugurated the University of Buenos Aires Museum of Ethnography.

The museum became the first in Argentina to introduce guided excursions for its patrons, and travels along the Inca road system resulted in the 1908 discovery of Pucará de Tilcara, among the best-preserved ruins of settlements by Pre-Inca cultures in the area. Elaborate petroglyphs and over 3,000 other relics were recovered and catalogued in the following three years, and most were added to the collections of the Museum of Ethnography. The settlement itself was declared a UNESCO World Heritage Site in 2003.

Dr. Ambrosetti died in 1917, and its management was continued by his collaborators, Drs. Salvador Debenedetti and Félix Outes. The museum was relocated to its present location in the city's Montserrat ward in 1927; the Italianate structure had been designed by Pedro Benoit for the School of Law, and completed in 1878. Many of the collections of archeology and anthropology of the Bernardino Rivadavia Natural Sciences Museum were assigned to this museum in the decade of 1940, despite this, the institution became largely overshadowed. It was bolstered, however, by the 1958 creation of a Degree in Anthropology by the University of Buenos Aires, and the institution was subsequently transferred to the university's School of Philosophy and Letters.
