= Quilme people =

Indigenous people of Argentina

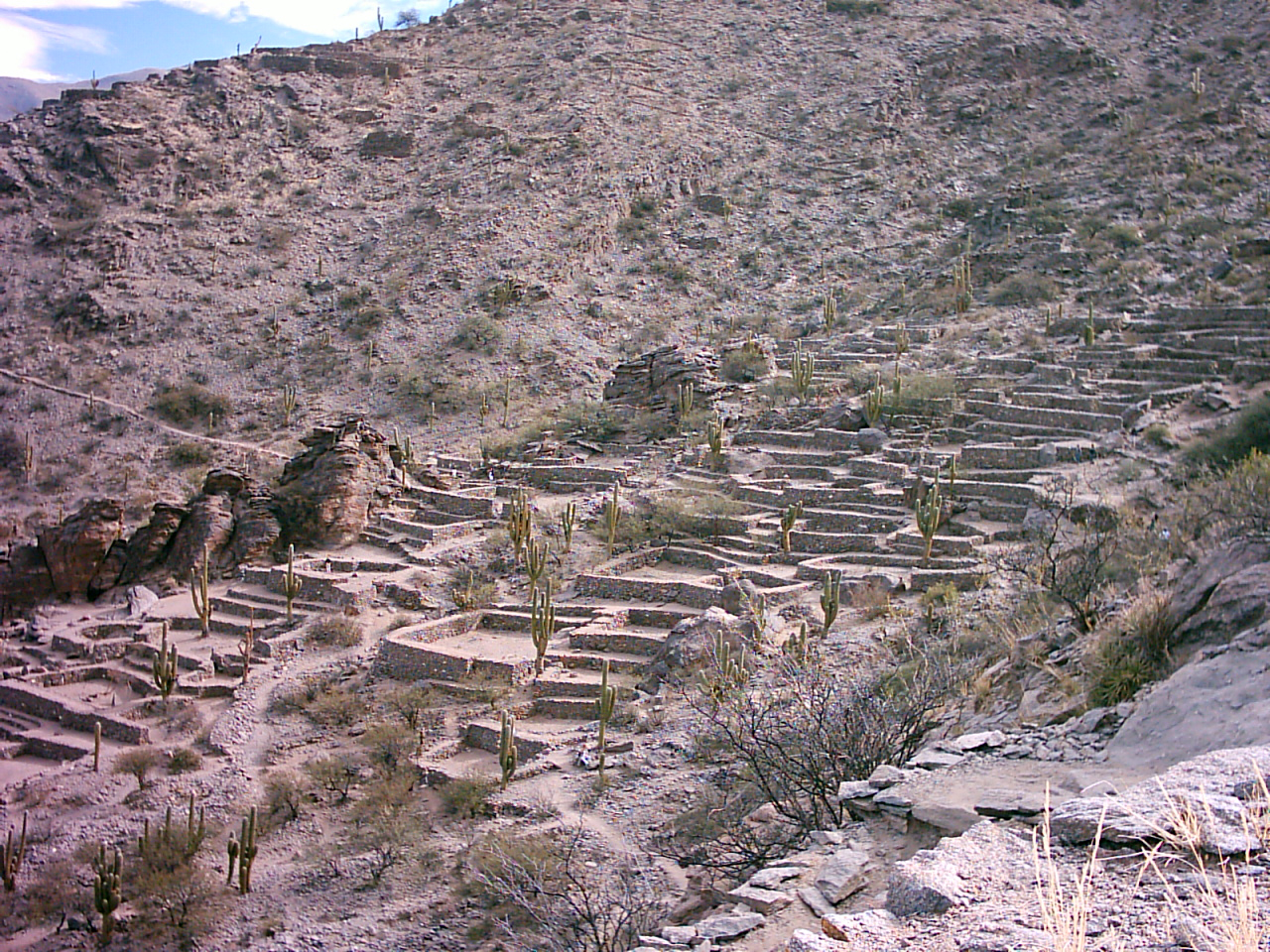
Ruins of the Quilmes civilization, Tucumán Province.

The Quilmes (Cacán: Kélm(e)), also known as Kilmes, are an Indigenous tribe of the Diaguita group settled in the western subandean valleys of today's Tucumán province, in northwestern Argentina. They fiercely resisted the Inca invasions of the 15th century, and continued to resist the Spaniards for 130 years, until being defeated in 1667. Spanish invaders relocated the last 2,000 survivors to a reservation (reducción) 20 km south of Buenos Aires. This 1,500 km journey was made by foot, causing hundreds of Quilmes to die in the process. By 1810, the reservation was abandoned as a result of its having become a ghost town. The survivors ultimately settled in what is now the city of Quilmes.

The Quilmes were one of the fiercest cultures which resisted the Incas but eventually fell to the Spaniards. Today, there are only a few Quilmes left in Tucumán Province.

== Quilmes ruins ==
On the way to Cafayate, 182 km from San Miguel de Tucumán, the Ruins of Quilmes may be seen; this is a fortified citadel which was raised by the Quilmes Indians. One of the most important archaeological locations in Argentina, the ruins were discovered by ethnographer and historian Samuel Alejandro Lafone Quevedo in 1888 and restored in 1978. As of 2007, this archaeological site is in private hands, and has a private hotel on its territory.

== Population ==
Population at the beginning of the second half of the 17th century, is estimated in about 2,000 families, approximately 10,000 people. When the Calchaquí Wars ended about 2,000 people survived (1665), which were taken prisoners and deported to a reservation located near Buenos Aires. But to the reservation just arrived only 200 families (about 1,000 people). In 1726, there were 141 people. William Beresford found a ghost town when he visited the reservation during the first British invasion of the River Plate in 1806. According to the last parish priest of the reserve, the last natives died in the late 18th century. The population was decimated by the high rate of infant mortality and epidemics. The government officially declared the ethnic group extinct on February 12, 1812 (but admitting that there are mestizo families) and the reservation was finally closed on August 14, 1812.

== Eponyms ==
A species of lizard, Liolaemus quilmes, which is endemic to Argentina, is named in honor of the Quilmes People. There is also a dinosaur called Quilmesaurus.
