= Calchaquí =

Indigenous people of Argentina

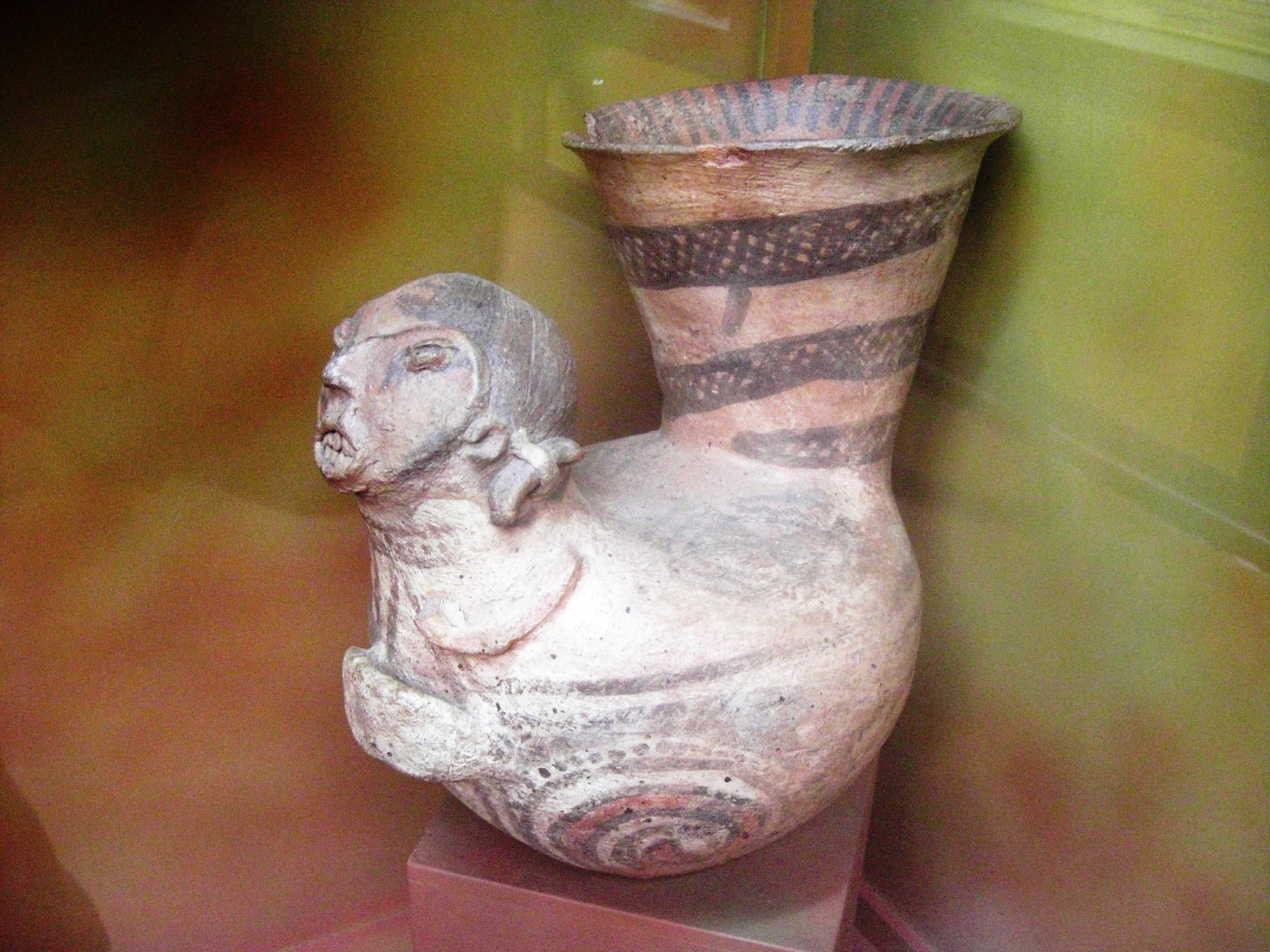
Calchaqui pottery

The Calchaquí or Kalchakí were a tribe of South American Indians of the Diaguita group, now extinct, who formerly occupied northern Argentina. Stone and other remains prove them to have reached a high degree of civilization. Under the leadership of Juan Calchaquí they offered a vigorous resistance to the first Spanish colonists coming from Chile.

Their language, known as Cacán, is of uncertain linguistic affiliation. The language was reportedly documented by the Jesuit Alonso de Bárcena, but the manuscript is lost.

Friedrich Ratzel in The History of Mankind reported in 1896 that among the Calchaquis of Northern Argentina is found pottery painted with line drawings of birds, reptiles, and human faces, which remind one of Peruvian and Malay work. The Calchaqui people had Bronze Age technology.

== Etymology ==
The name of "Calchaquí" was not given until the 17th century. The Europeans called a set of Diaguita cultures "Calchaquíes", such as Yocavil, Quilme, Tafí, Chicoana, Tilcara, Purmamarca, among others. The denomination "Calchaquí" seems to derive from one of the main kuraka (chief) who opposed the Spaniards: Kalchakí called by the Spaniards Juan Calchaquí, who dominated in the valley of Yocavil. Kalcha means "courageous" or "brave" and Qui means "very" or "much".

== Life and culture ==
They were farmers, herders, and great potters. They worshipped the sun, the moon, thunder and the earth, and spoke their own language called Kakán. With the third expansion of the Inca territory, in 1480, they were incorporated into the Inca Empire (Tawantinsuyu), from which they received a strong cultural influence.

== Calchaquí Wars ==
During the whole period of the conquest the Spaniards had not been able to penetrate in the Calchaquí Valleys, where the Diaguita culture (Pazioca or Pazioc) had taken refuge, an advanced confederation of independent agro-pottery lordships belonging to the Santa María culture, united by a common language, the Kakán, and in turn part of the great group of the Andean civilizations. The Spaniards referred to their members, incorrectly, as Calchaquíes, name corresponding to one of the Pazioca lordships (called "curacazgos" by the Spanish). These lordships were gathered in three great nations: Pular to the north, Diaguita to the west and Calchaquí to the east. Minor groups were the Ocloy formed by 2,000 people and the Calchaquí, some 12,500 people (2,500 tributary Indians), according to Sotelo Narváez (1583). An ancestral tradition of self-sufficiency of the Paziocas and the scarce number of Spaniards in Tucumán, allowed a series of defense acts of its territory by the Pular-Diaguita-Calchaquí confederation, known as Calchachi by the Spanish. These fights have been historically known as the Calchaquí Wars that extended for more than a century.

- The First Calchaquí War was unleashed in 1560 and was led by the kuraka Juan Calchaquí along with the kurakas Quipildor and Viltipoco. The confederation managed to keep the Europeans out of its territory, razing the three new cities founded by the Spaniards: Cañete, Córdoba de Calchaquí, and Londres.
- The Viltipoco rebellion. Later in 1594 Viltipoco, chief of the Omaguaca, initiated a new uprising gathering an army of 10,000 lances, however, 25 Spaniards and their native allies under the command of the captain Francisco de Argañaras y Murguía infiltrated the Quebrada de Humahuaca where they attacked by surprise the enemy camp, killing the chiefs and capturing Viltipoco, who was taken to San Salvador de Jujuy where he died in prison some years later.
- The Second Calchaquí War lasted 7 years (1630-1637) and was directed by the kuraka Chalamín. The Paziocas again destroyed the cities installed by the Spaniards, Londres II and Nuestra Señora de Guadalupe. In 1637 the Spanish army captured and executed Chalamín. The inhabitants who participated in the war were deported and reduced to slavery by the Spaniards.
- The Third Calchaquí War lasted for eight years (1658-1667). This war had the particularity that, in its beginnings, the Spanish adventurer Pedro Bohórquez, who claimed to be Inca, the "Inca Hualpa" (Inka Wallpa), was accepted as a military leader by the Paziocas. Bohórquez maneuvered cunningly, obtained even the support of the Jesuits and organized a solid indigenous army of 6,000 warriors with which he maintained control of the region for several years. However, in 1659, Bohórquez handed over to the Spaniards with the intention of being forgiven, who sent him to Lima and finally executed him. The confederation continued the war led by José Henriquez. When the lordship of Quilme was defeated in 1665, the Spaniards ordered their complete uprooting and deportation of all its 11,000 members to the Pampean territories close to Buenos Aires, where the city of Quilmes stands today, and where they finally disappeared as an ethnic group. The war ended on January 2, 1667, when the last of the Pazioca lordships, Acali or Calian, was defeated. The Spaniards took the decision to divide, deport, and reduce all the Diaguita peoples to slavery.

== See also ==
- Diaguita
- Pedro Bohórquez
- Tucumán Province
