= List of birds of Alagoas =

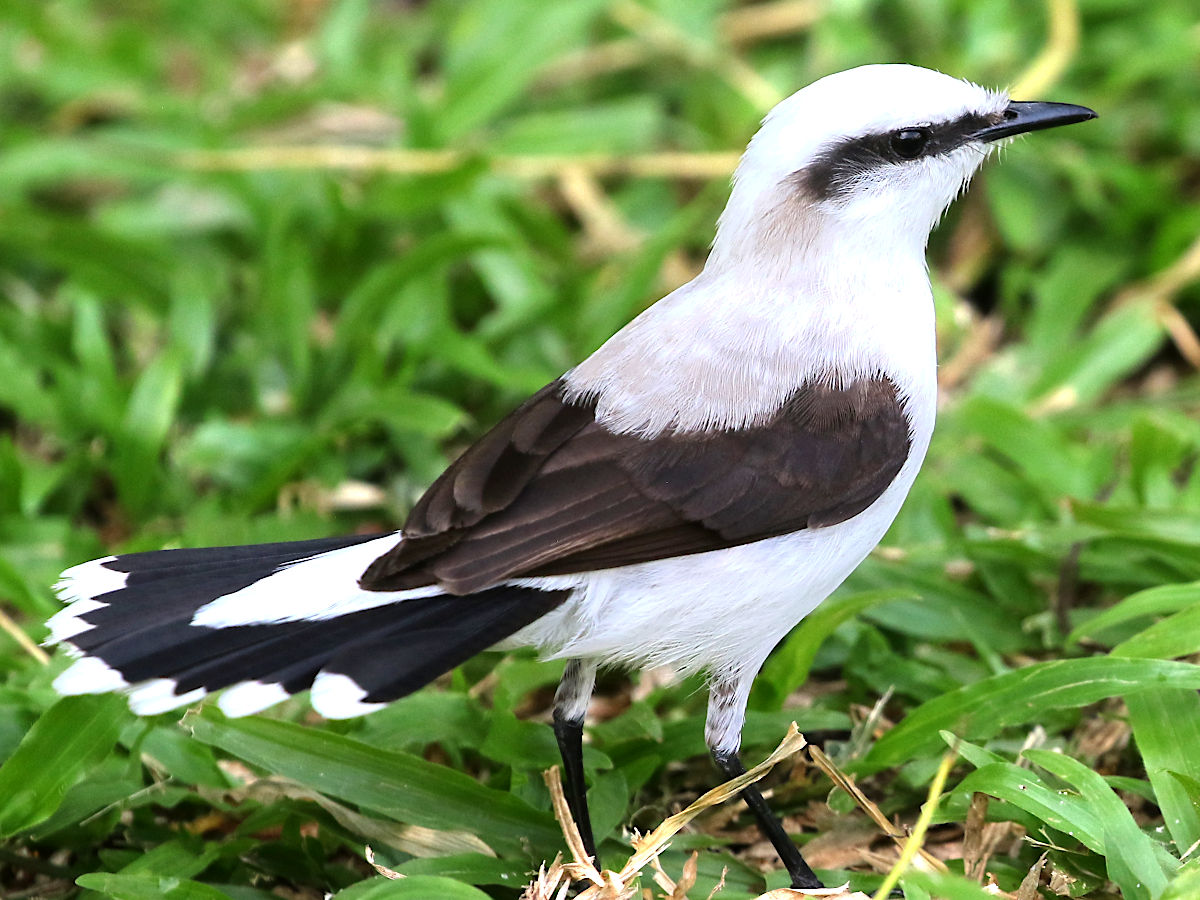
The masked water tyrant is a very common bird throughout the caatinga in Alagoas

This list of birds of Alagoas includes species documented in the Brazilian state of Alagoas. The backbone of this list is provided by Avibase, and all additions that differ from this list have citations. As of September 2024, there are 630 recorded bird species in Alagoas.

The following tags note species in each of those categories:

- (A) Accidental - species not regularly occurring in Alagoas
- (E) Extinct - species that is extinct globally
- (EB) Endemic to Brazil - species that is only found in Brazil
- (ES) Endemic to Alagoas - species that is only found in Alagoas
- (EW) Extinct in the wild - species that is now only found in captivity
- (Ex) Extirpated - species that is locally extinct
- (I) Introduced - species that is not native to Alagoas

== Tinamous ==
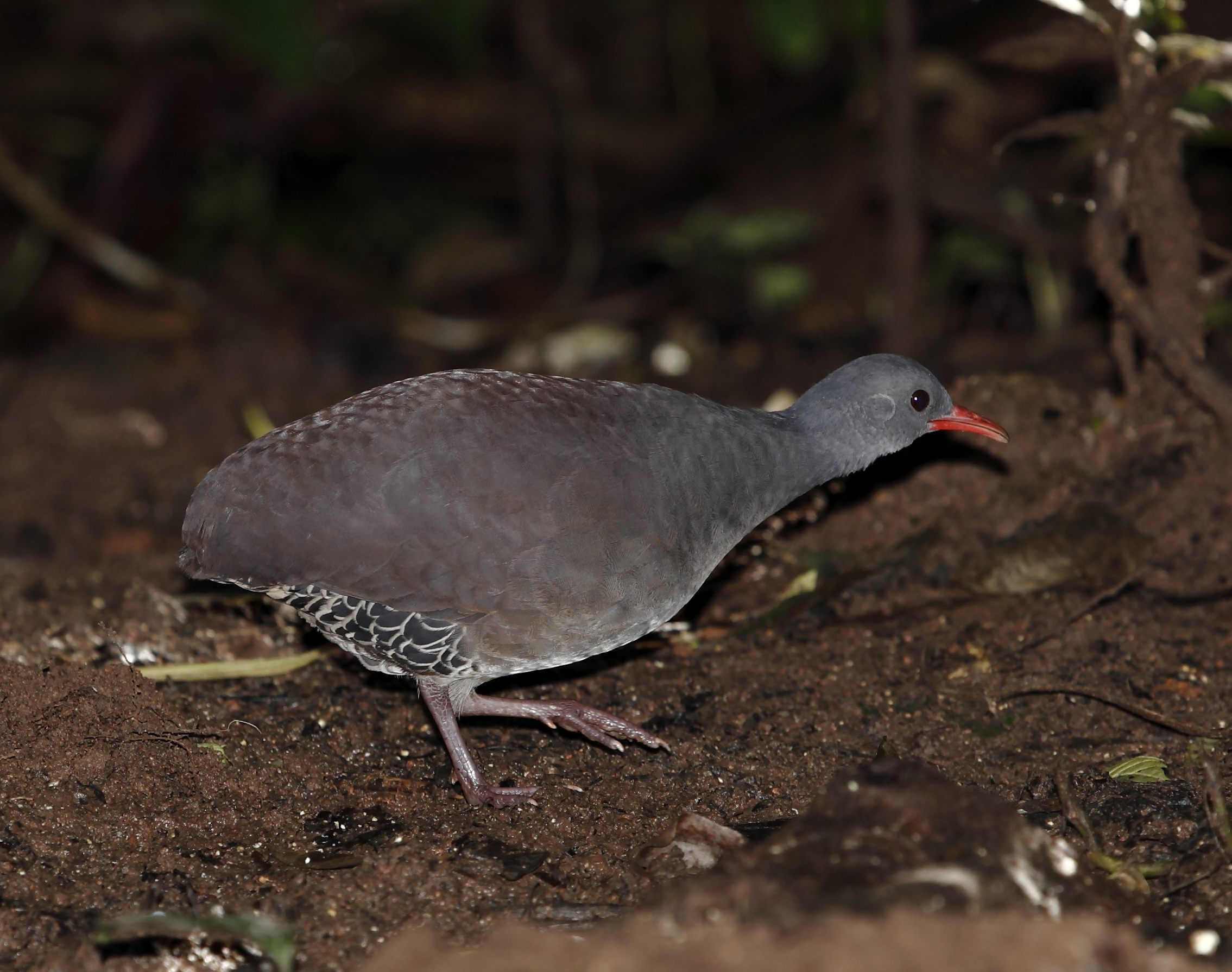
Tataupa tinamou

Order: Tinamiformes Family: Tinamidae

- Solitary tinamou (Tinamus solitarius)
- Little tinamou (Crypturellus soui)
- Brazilian tinamou (Crypturellus strigulosus)
- Yellow-legged tinamou (Crypturellus noctivagus) (EB)
- Small-billed tinamou (Crypturellus parvirostris)
- Tataupa tinamou (Crypturellus tataupa)
- Red-winged tinamou (Rhynchotus rufescens)
- White-bellied nothura (Nothura boraquira)
- Spotted nothura (Nothura maculosa)

== Ducks, geese, and waterfowl ==
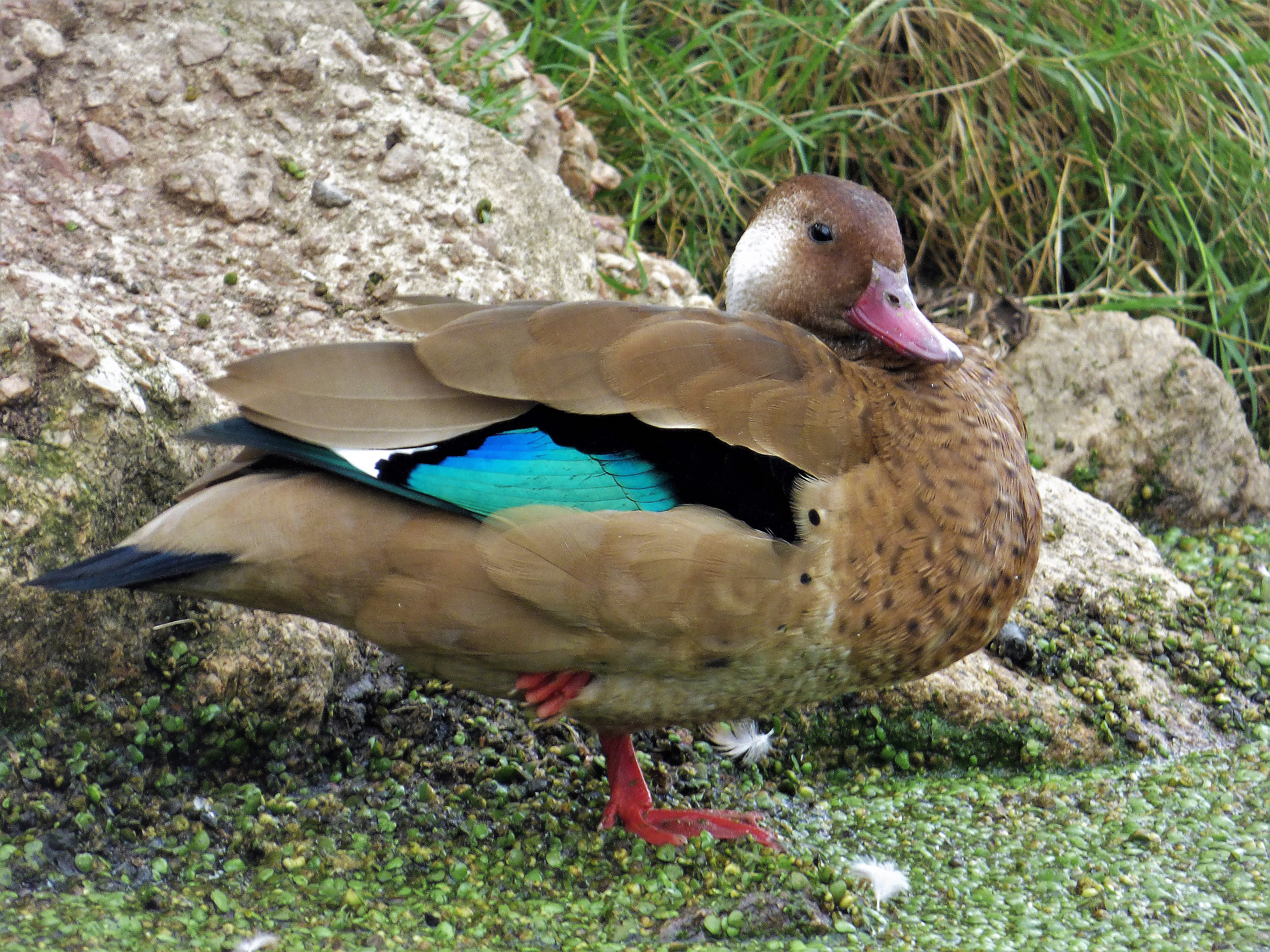
Brazilian teal

Order: Anseriformes Family: Anatidae

- White-faced whistling duck (Dendrocygna viduata)
- Black-bellied whistling duck (Dendrocygna autumnalis)
- Fulvous whistling duck (Dendrocygna bicolor)
- Masked duck (Nomonyx dominicus)
- Southern pochard (Netta erythrophthalma)
- Brazilian teal (Amazonetta brasiliensis)
- White-cheeked pintail (Anas bahamensis)
- Comb duck (Sarkidiornis melanotos)
- Muscovy duck (Cairina moschata)

== Chachalacas, guans, and curassows ==
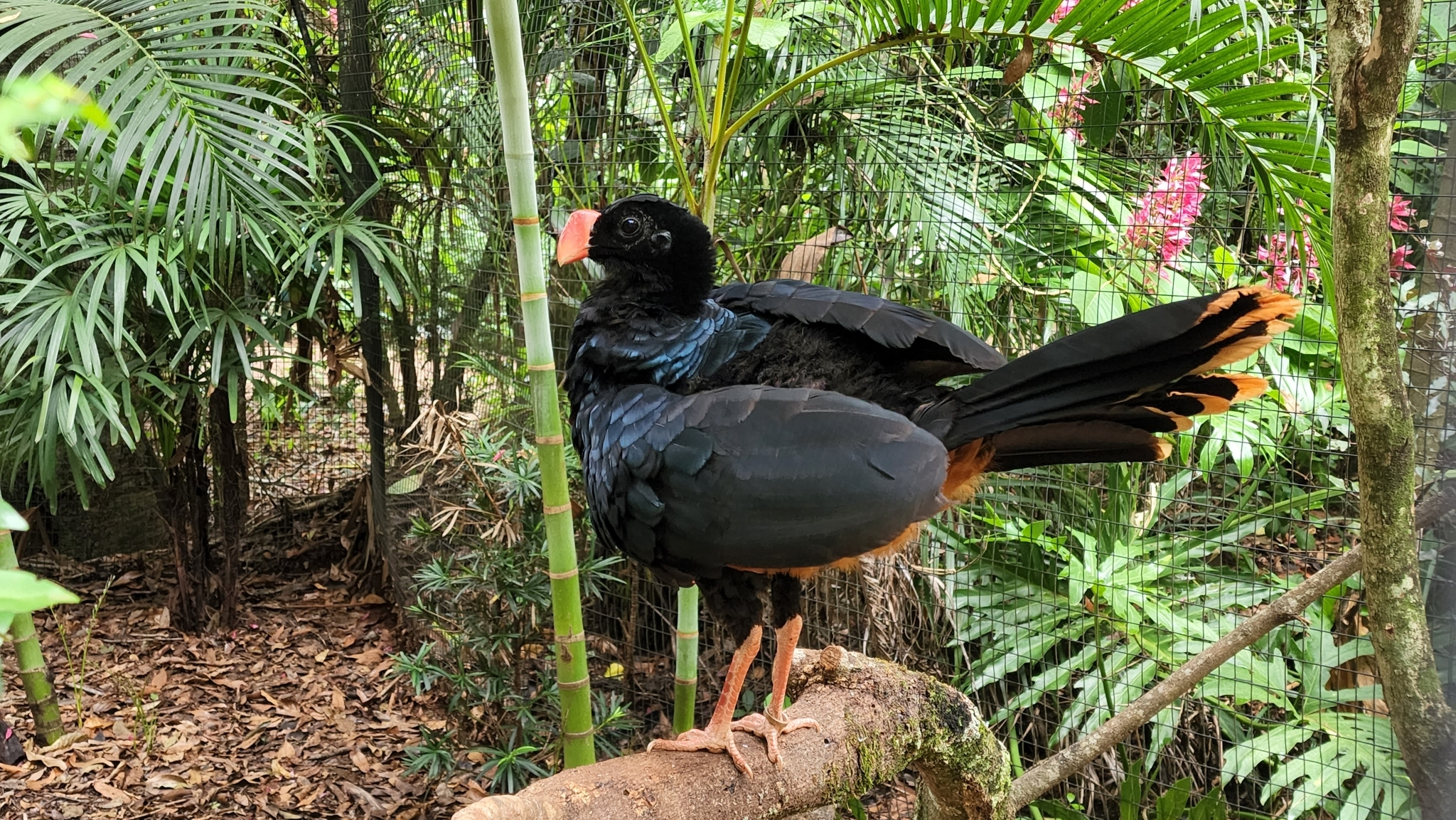
Alagoas curassow

Order: Galliformes Family: Cracidae

- Rusty-margined guan (Penelope superciliaris)
- White-browed guan (Penelope jacucaca) (EB)
- East Brazilian chachalaca (Ortalis araucuan) (EB)
- Alagoas curassow (Mitu mitu) (ES)(EW)

== New World quail ==
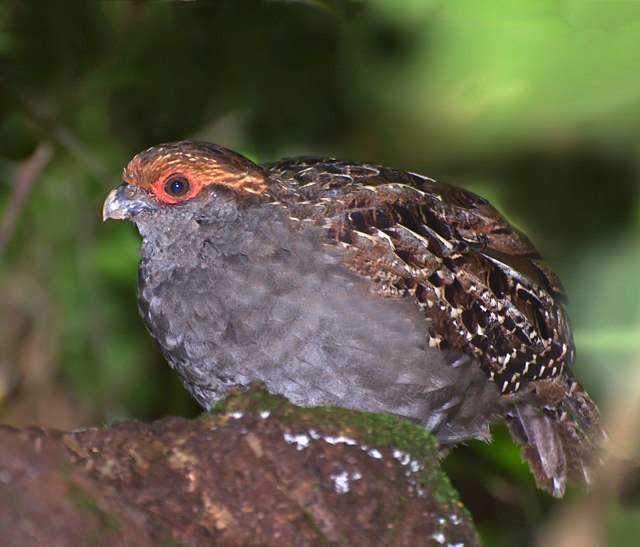
Spot-winged wood quail

Order: Galliformes Family: Odontophoridae

- Spot-winged wood quail (Odontophorus capueira)

== Grebes ==
Order: Podicipediformes Family: Podicipedidae

- Pied-billed grebe (Podilymbus podiceps)
- Least grebe (Tachybaptus dominicus)

== Doves and pigeons ==
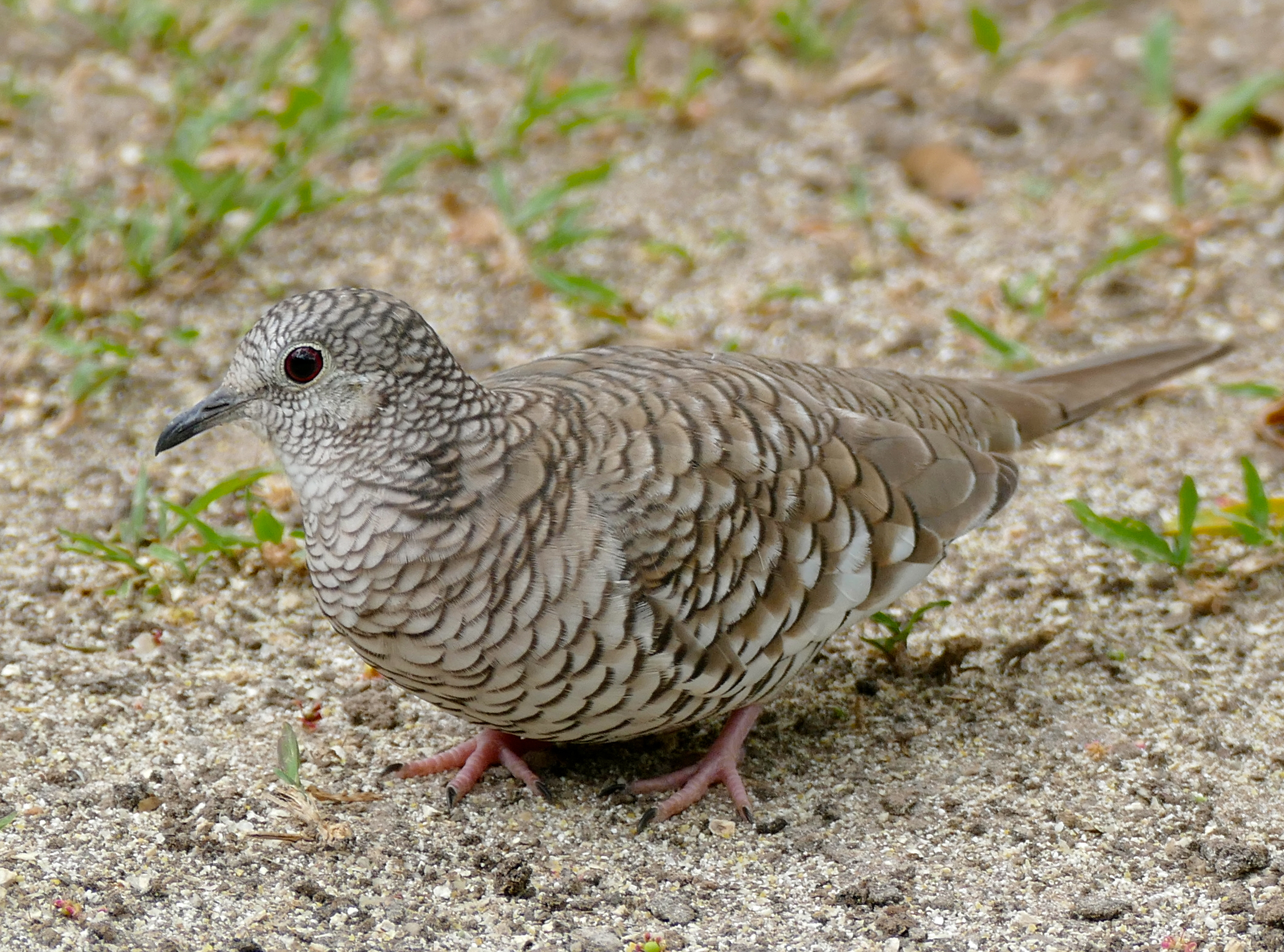
Scaled dove

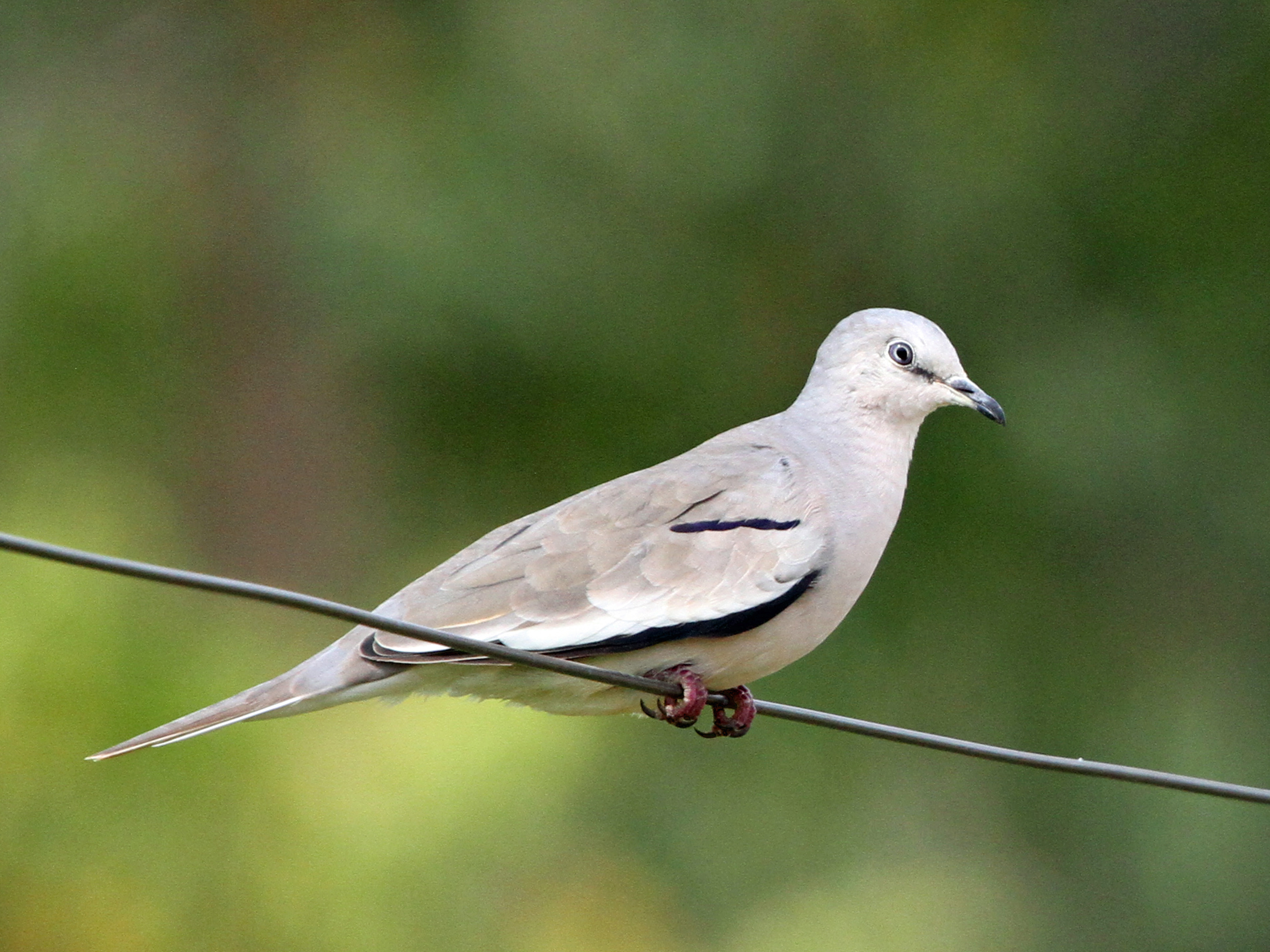
Picui ground dove

Order: Columbiformes Family: Columbidae

- Rock pigeon (Columba livia) (I)
- Scaled pigeon (Patagioenas speciosa)
- Picazuro pigeon (Patagioenas picazuro)
- Pale-vented pigeon (Patagioenas cayennensis)
- White-tipped dove (Leptotila verreauxi)
- Grey-fronted dove (Leptotila rufaxilla)
- Violaceous quail-dove (Geotrygon violacea)
- Ruddy quail-dove (Geotrygon montana)
- Eared dove (Zenaida auriculata)
- Scaled dove (Columbina squammata)
- Common ground dove (Columbina passerina)
- Plain-breasted ground dove (Columbina minuta)
- Ruddy ground dove (Columbina talpacoti)
- Picui ground dove (Columbina picui)
- Blue ground dove (Claravis pretiosa)

== Potoos ==
Order: Nyctibiiformes Family: Nyctibiidae

- Common potoo (Nyctibius griseus)

== Nightjars ==
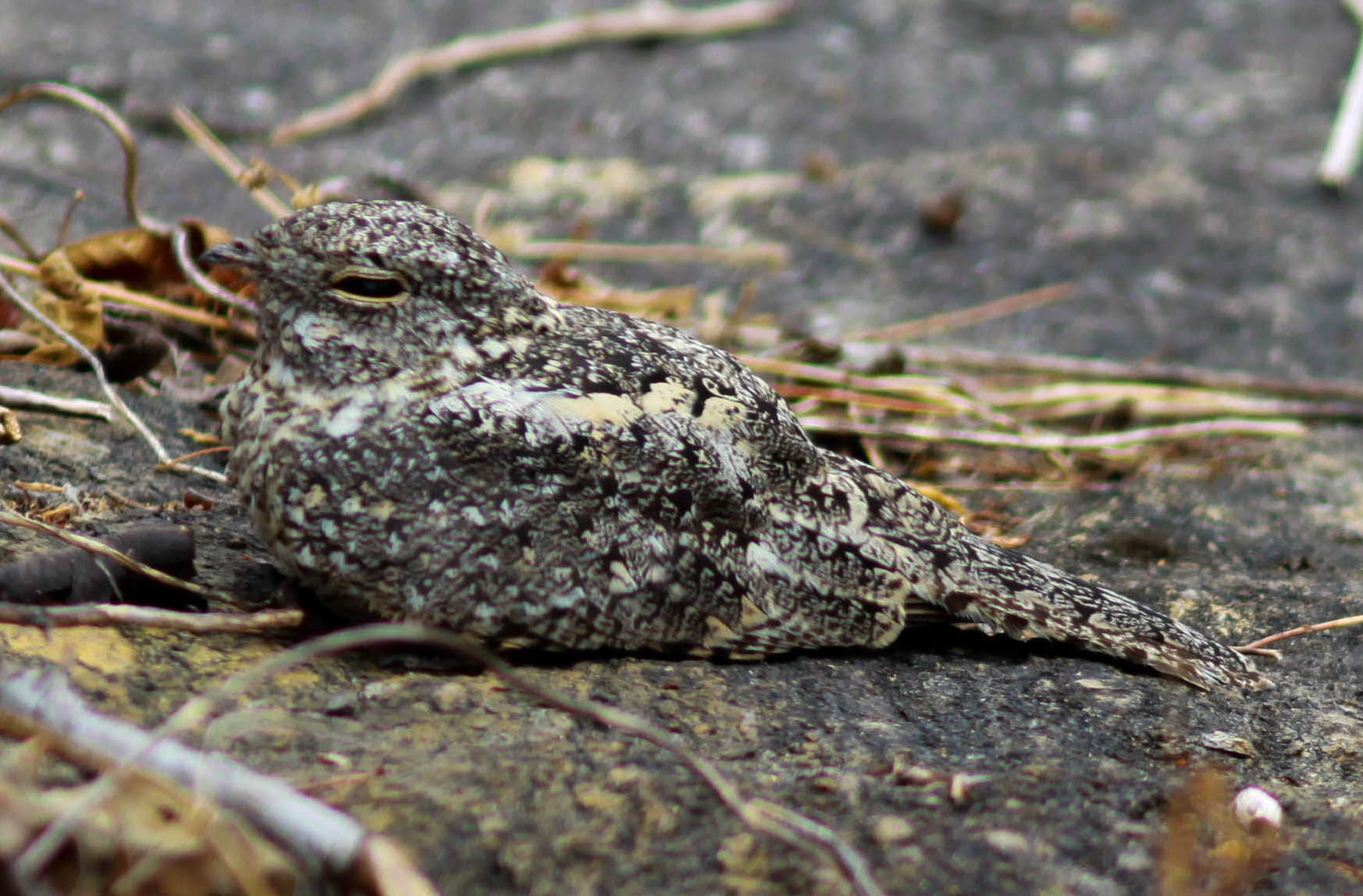
Pygmy nightjar

Order: Caprimulgiformes Family: Caprimulgidae

- Nacunda nighthawk (Chordeiles nacunda)
- Least nighthawk (Chordeiles pusillus)
- Common nighthawk (Chordeiles minor)
- Lesser nighthawk (Chordeiles acutipennis)
- Short-tailed nighthawk (Lurocalis semitorquatus)
- Pygmy nightjar (Nyctipolus hirundinaceus) (EB)
- Common pauraque (Nyctidromus albicollis)
- Little nightjar (Setopagis parvula)
- Scissor-tailed nightjar (Hydropsalis torquata)
- Rufous nightjar (Antrostomus rufus)

== Swifts ==
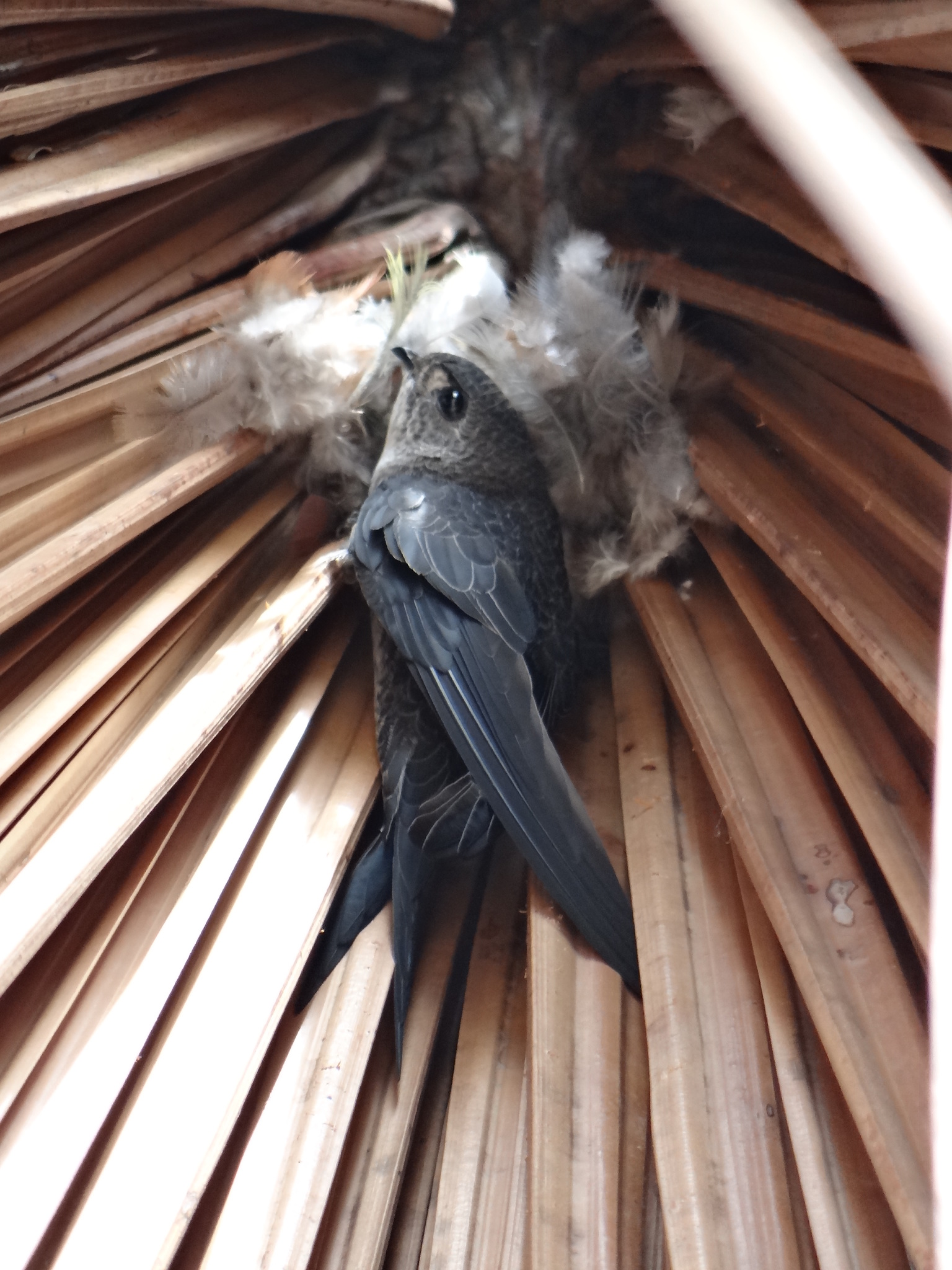
Fork-tailed palm swift

Order: Apodiformes Family: Apodidae

- Great dusky swift (Cypseloides senex)
- Biscutate swift (Streptoprocne biscutata)
- Band-rumped swift (Chaetura spinicaudus)
- Grey-rumped swift (Chaetura cinereiventris)
- Sick's swift (Chaetura meridionalis)
- Fork-tailed palm swift (Tachornis squamata)
- Lesser swallow-tailed swift (Panyptila cayennensis)

== Hummingbirds ==
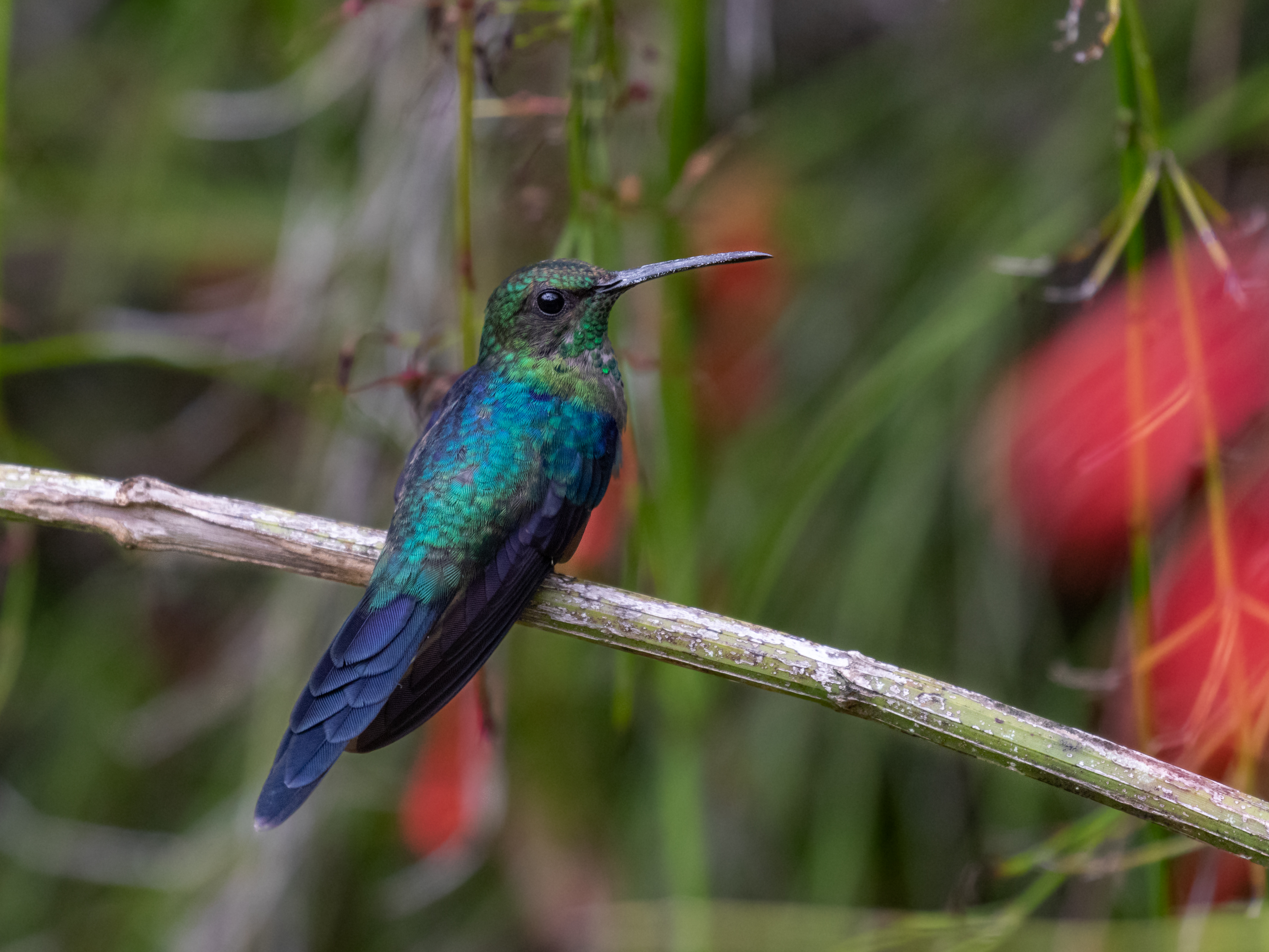
Long-tailed woodnymph

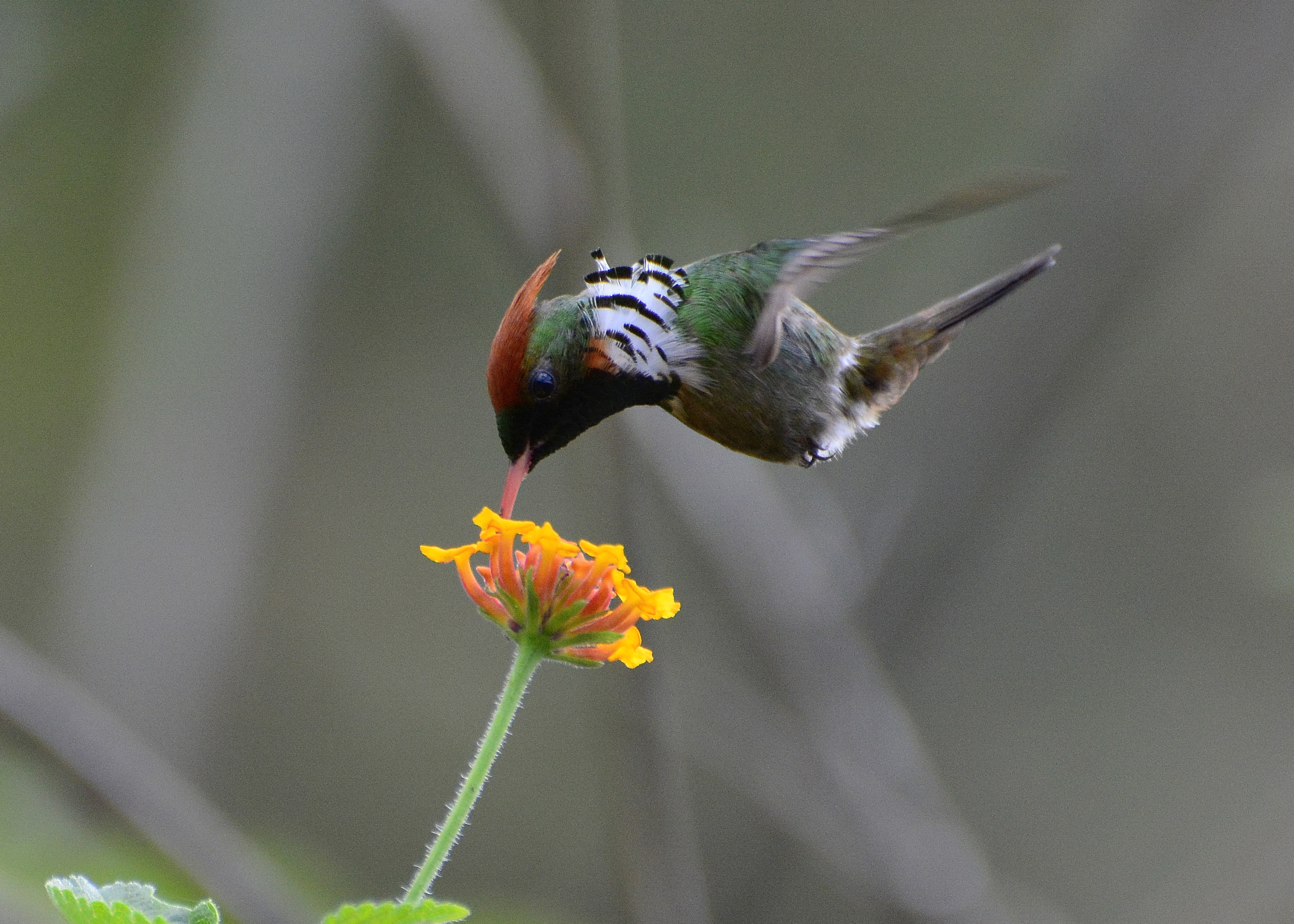
Frilled coquette

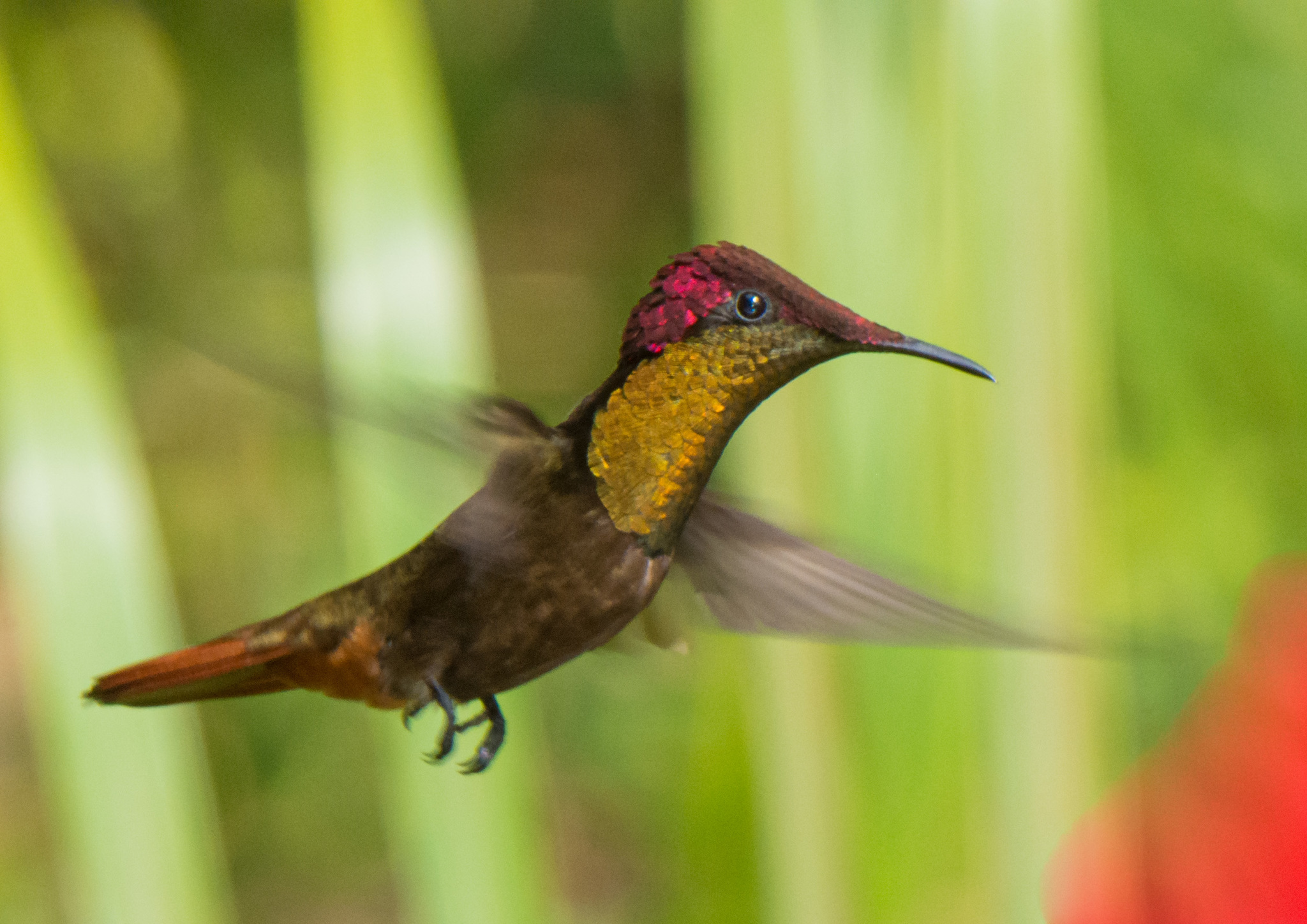
Ruby-topaz hummingbird

Order: Apodiformes Family: Trochilidae

- Black jacobin (Florisuga fusca)
- Rufous-breasted hermit (Glaucis hirsutus)
- Broad-tipped hermit (Anopetia gounellei) (EB)
- Reddish hermit (Phaethornis ruber)
- Planalto hermit (Phaethornis pretrei)
- Great-billed hermit (Phaethornis malaris)
- Horned sungem (Heliactin bilophus)
- Black-eared fairy (Heliothryx auritus)
- White-tailed goldenthroat (Polytmus guainumbi)
- Ruby-topaz hummingbird (Chrysolampis mosquitus)
- Black-throated mango (Anthracothorax nigricollis)
- Racket-tailed coquette (Discosura longicaudus)
- Frilled coquette (Lophornis magnificus) (EB)
- Glittering-bellied emerald (Chlorostilbon lucidus)
- Blue-chinned sapphire (Chlorestes notata)
- Sombre hummingbird (Aphantochroa cirrochloris) (EB)
- Swallow-tailed hummingbird (Eupetomena macroura)
- Long-tailed woodnymph (Thalurania watertonii) (EB)
- Plain-bellied emerald (Amazilia leucogaster)
- Versicolored emerald (Amazilia versicolor)
- Glittering-throated emerald (Amazilia fimbriata)
- Rufous-throated sapphire (Hylocharis sapphirina)
- White-chinned sapphire (Hylocharis cyanus)
- Stripe-breasted starthroat (Heliomaster squamosus) (EB)
- Amethyst woodstar (Calliphlox amethystina)

== Cuckoos ==
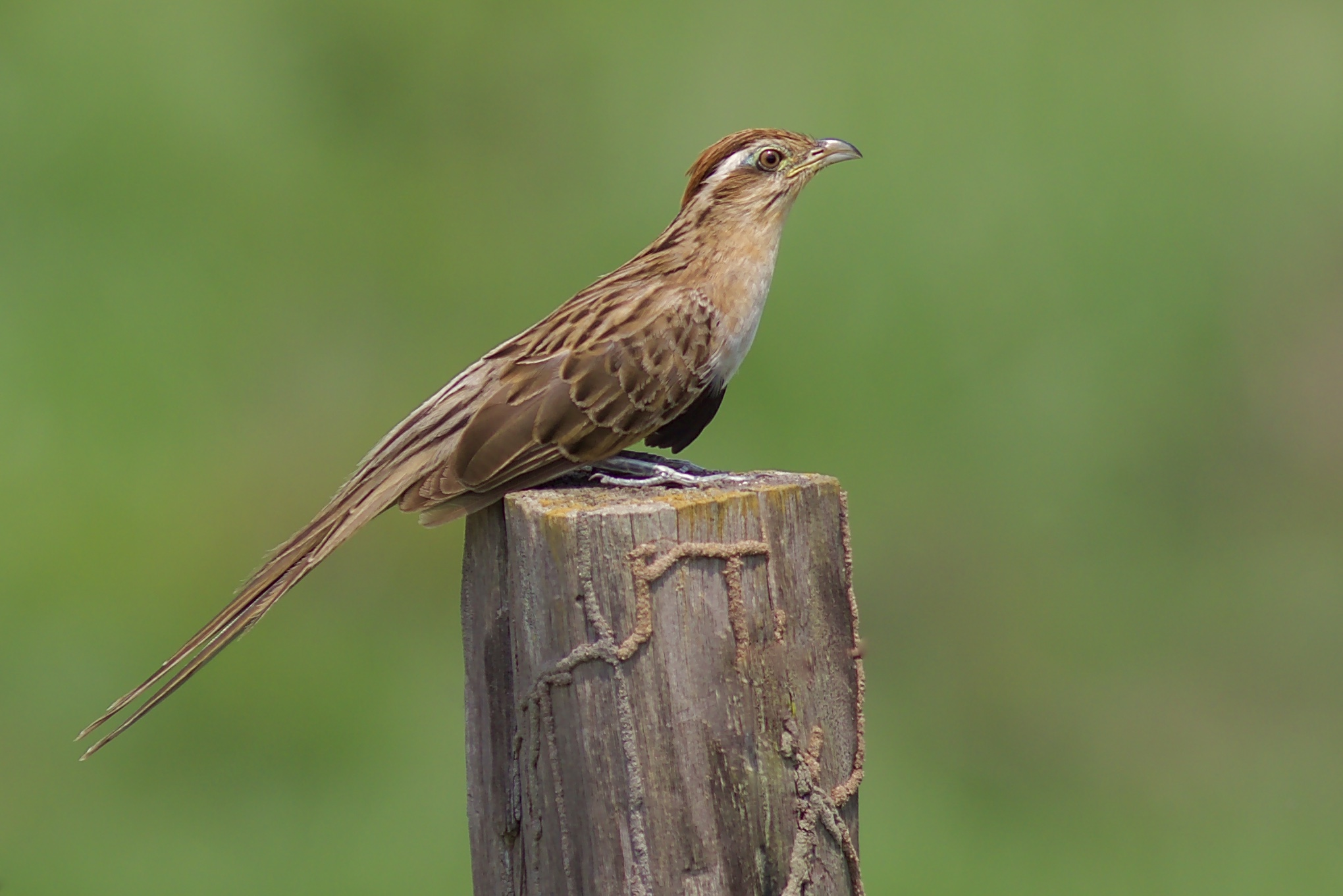
Striped cuckoo

Order: Cuculiformes Family: Cuculidae

- Greater ani (Crotophaga major)
- Smooth-billed ani (Crotophaga ani)
- Guira cuckoo (Guira guira)
- Striped cuckoo (Tapera naevia)
- Squirrel cuckoo (Piaya cayana)
- Ash-colored cuckoo (Micrococcyx cinereus) (A)
- Yellow-billed cuckoo (Coccyzus americanus)
- Pearly-breasted cuckoo (Coccyzus euleri)
- Dark-billed cuckoo (Coccyzus melacoryphus)

== Limpkins ==
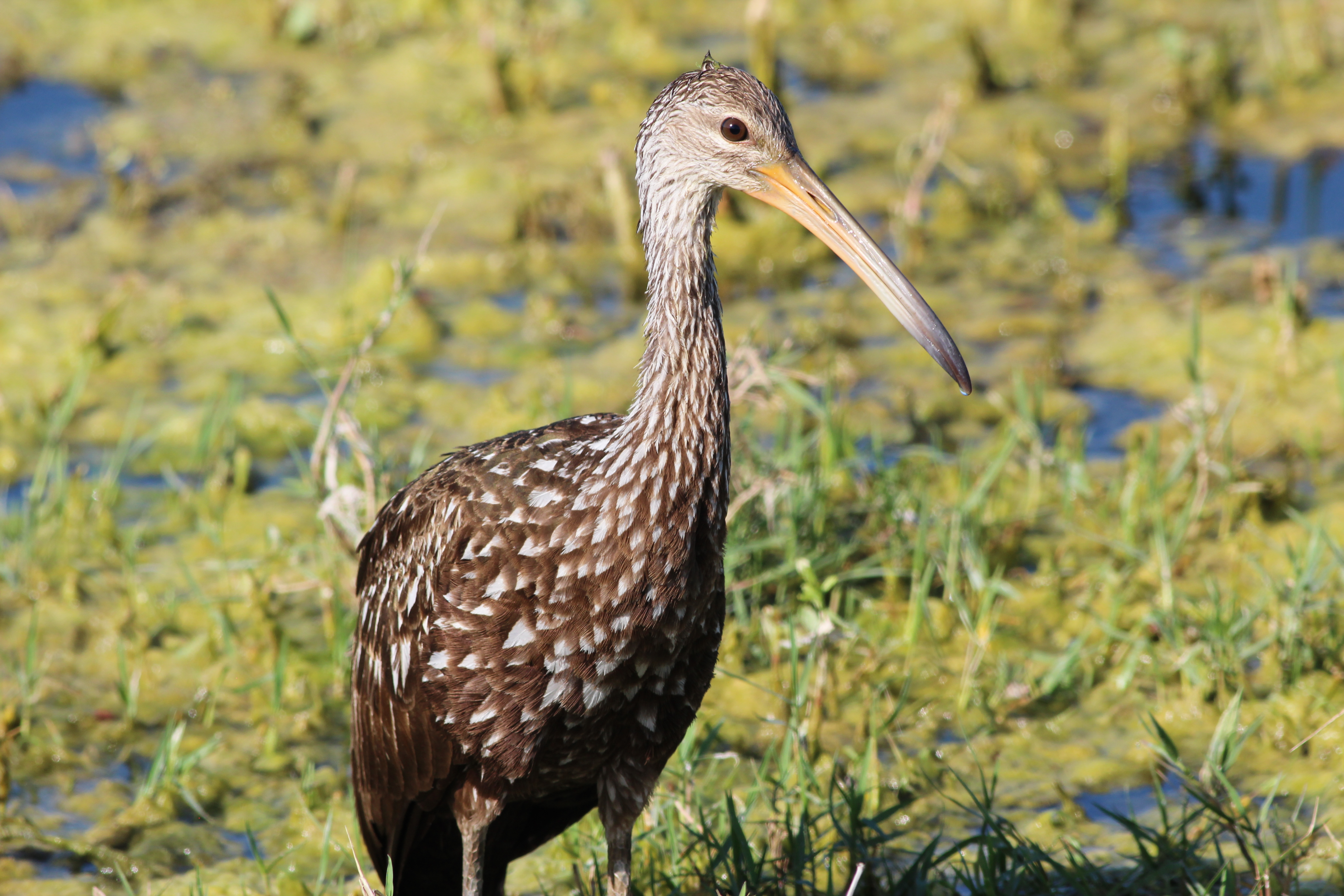
Limpkin

Order: Gruiformes Family: Aramidae

- Limpkin (Aramus guarauna)

== Rails ==
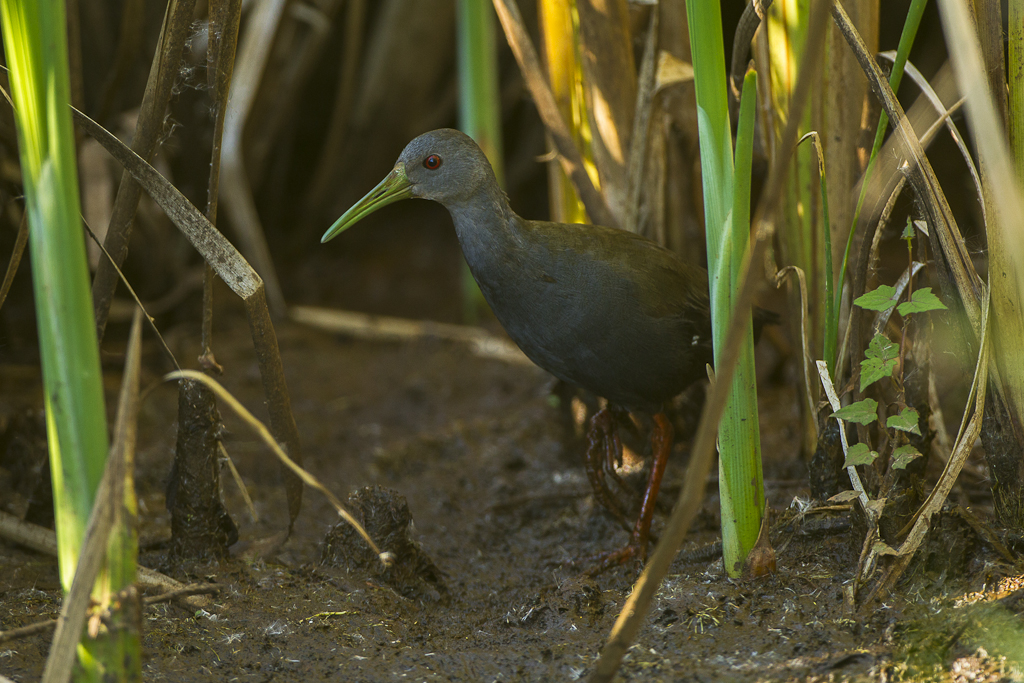
Blackish rail

Order: Gruiformes Family: Rallidae

- Mangrove rail (Rallus longirostris)
- Russet-crowned crake (Rufirallus viridis)
- Rufous-sided crake (Laterallus melanophaius)
- Grey-breasted crake (Laterallus exilis)
- Little wood rail (Aramides mangle) (EB)
- Giant wood rail (Aramides ypecaha) (A)
- Grey-necked wood rail (Aramides cajaneus)
- Uniform crake (Amaurolimnas concolor)
- Paint-billed crake (Neocrex erythrops)
- Spotted rail (Pardirallus maculatus)
- Blackish rail (Pardirallus nigricans)
- Yellow-breasted crake (Hapalocrex flaviventer)
- Ash-throated crake (Porzana albicollis)
- Purple gallinule (Porphyrio martinicus)
- Common gallinule (Gallinula galeata)
- Spot-flanked gallinule (Gallinula melanops)

== Sungrebes ==
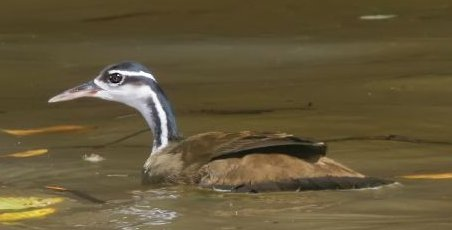
Sungrebe

Order: Gruiformes Family: Heliornithidae

- Sungrebe (Heliornis fulica)

== Austral storm petrels ==
Order: Procellariiformes Family: Oceanitidae

- Wilson's storm-petrel (Oceanites oceanicus)
- Black-bellied storm-petrel (Fregetta tropica) (A)

== Albatrosses ==
Order: Procellariiformes Family: Diomedeidae

- Light-mantled albatross (Phoebetria palpebrata) (A)

== Northern storm petrels ==
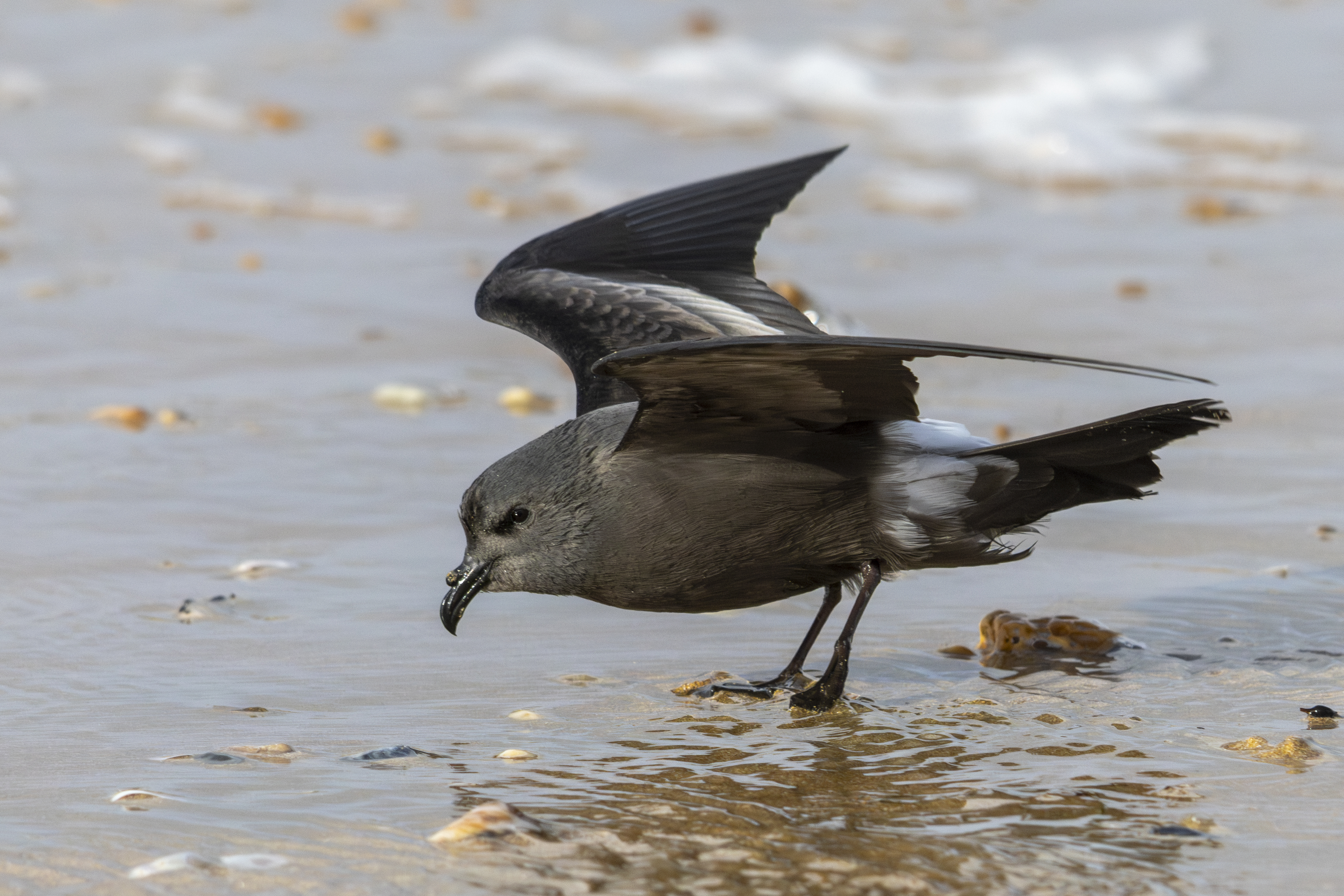
Leach's storm-petrel

Order: Procellariiformes Family: Hydrobatidae

- Leach's storm-petrel (Hydrobates leucorhous)

== Petrels, prions, and shearwaters ==
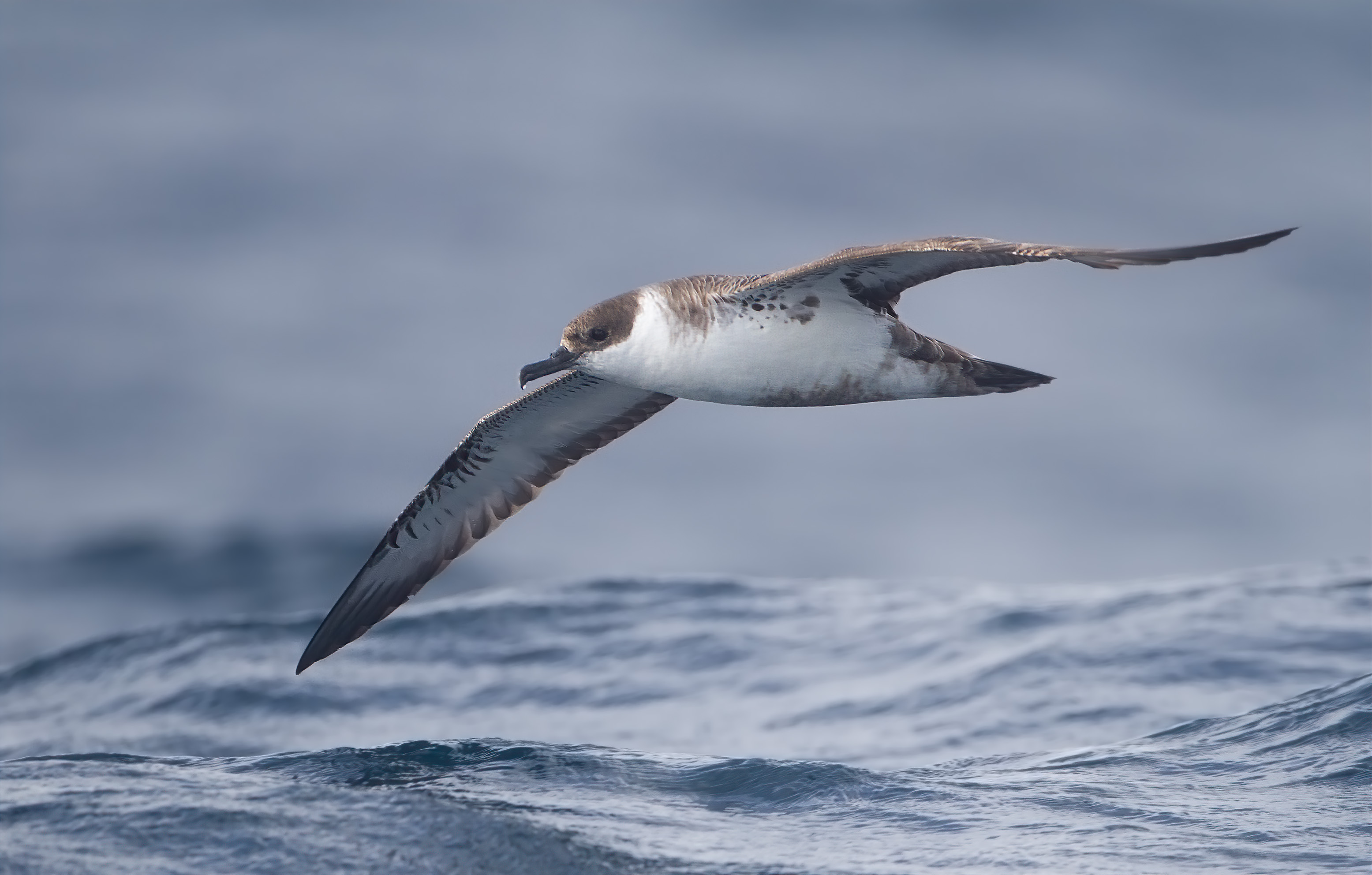
Great shearwater

Order: Procellariiformes Family: Procellariidae

- White-chinned petrel (Procellaria aequinoctialis)
- Sooty shearwater (Ardenna grisea)
- Great shearwater (Ardenna gravis)
- Scopoli's shearwater (Calonectris diomedea) (A)
- Cory's shearwater (Calonectris borealis) (A)
- Cape Verde shearwater (Calonectris edwardsii)
- Manx shearwater (Puffinus puffinus)

== Storks ==
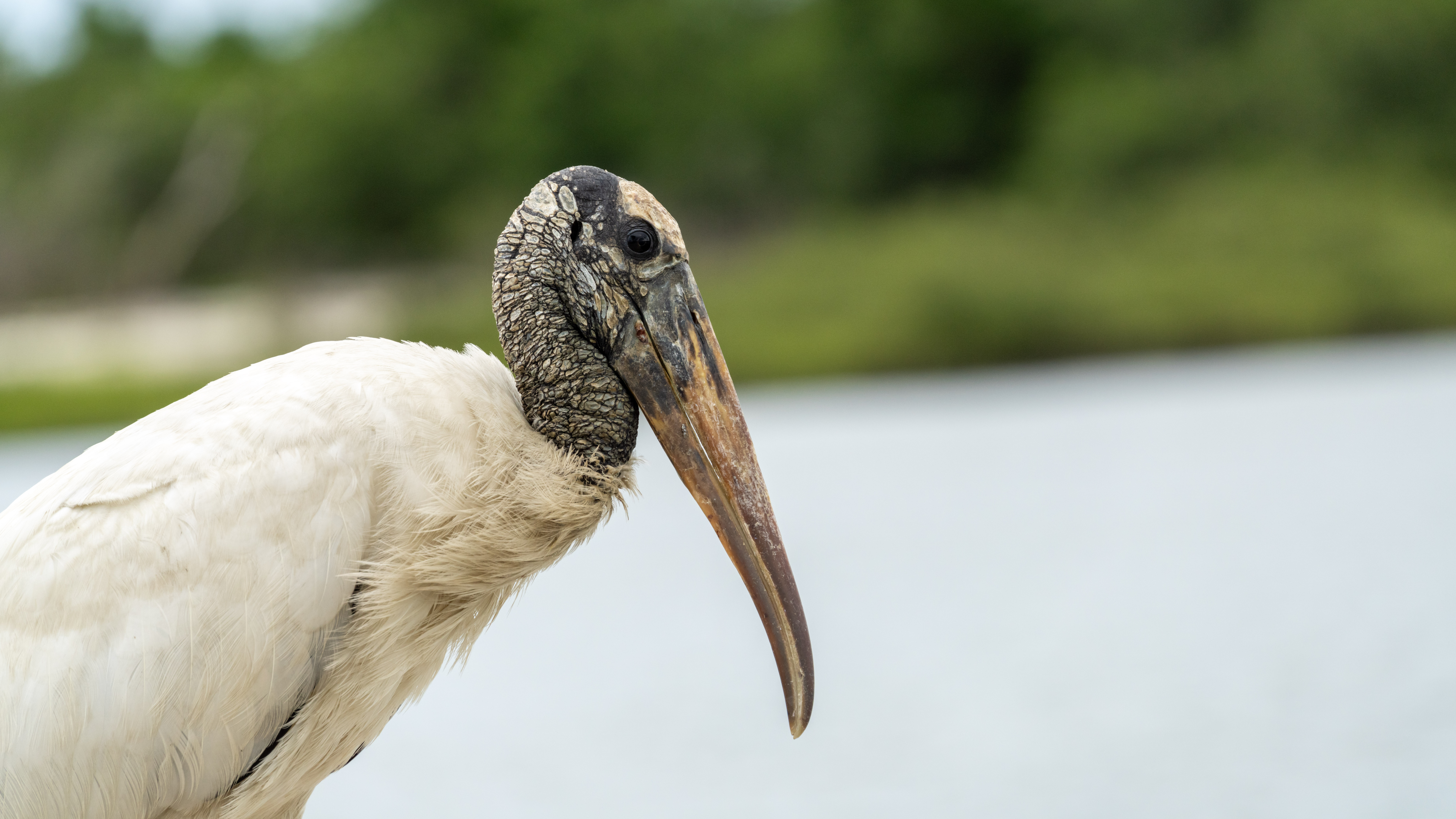
Wood stork

Order: Pelecaniformes Family: Ciconiidae

- Wood stork (Mycteria americana)
- Jabiru (Jabiru mycteria)

== Pelicans ==
Order: Pelecaniformes Family: Pelecanidae

- Brown pelican (Pelecanus occidentalis) (A)

== Herons and egrets ==
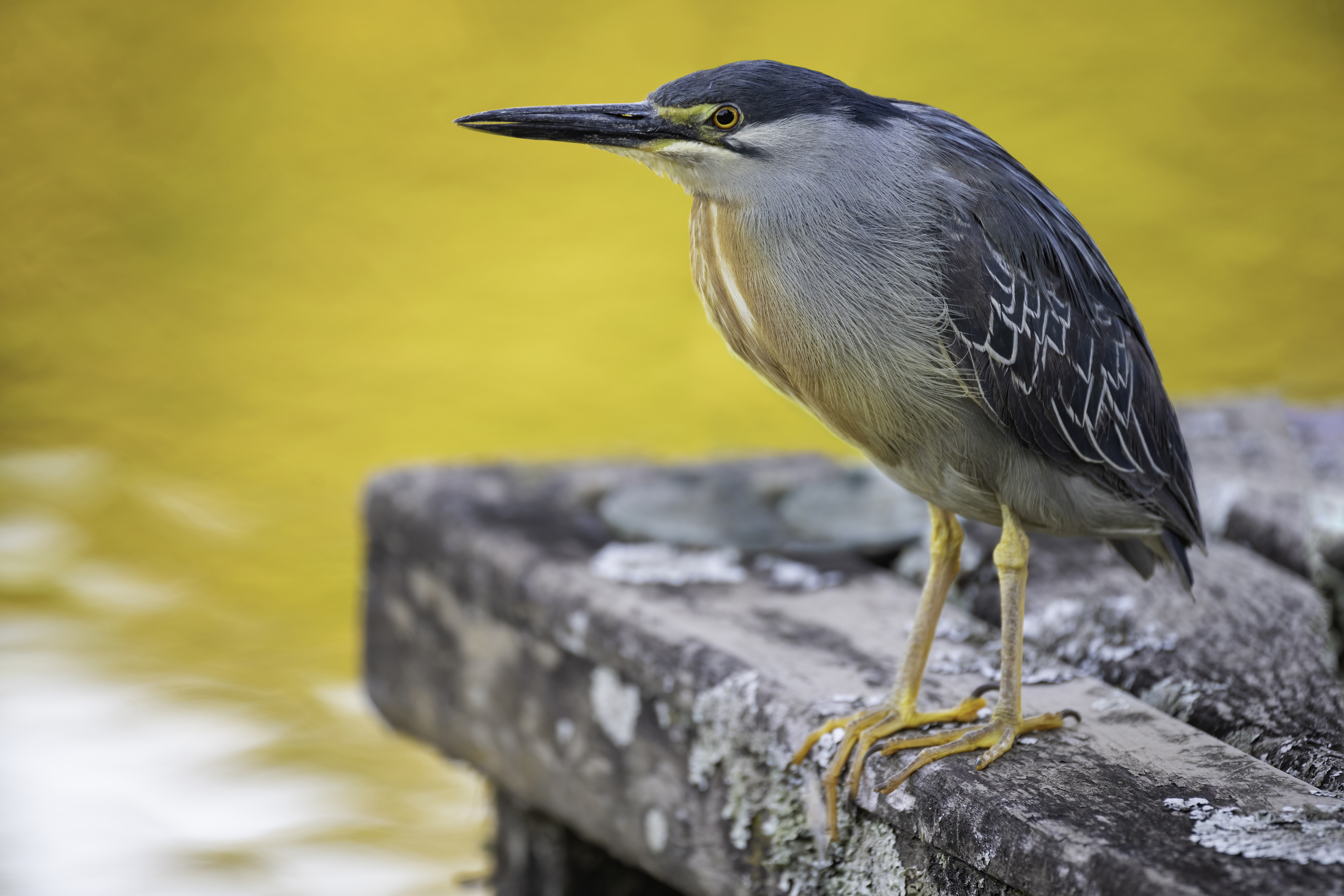
Striated heron

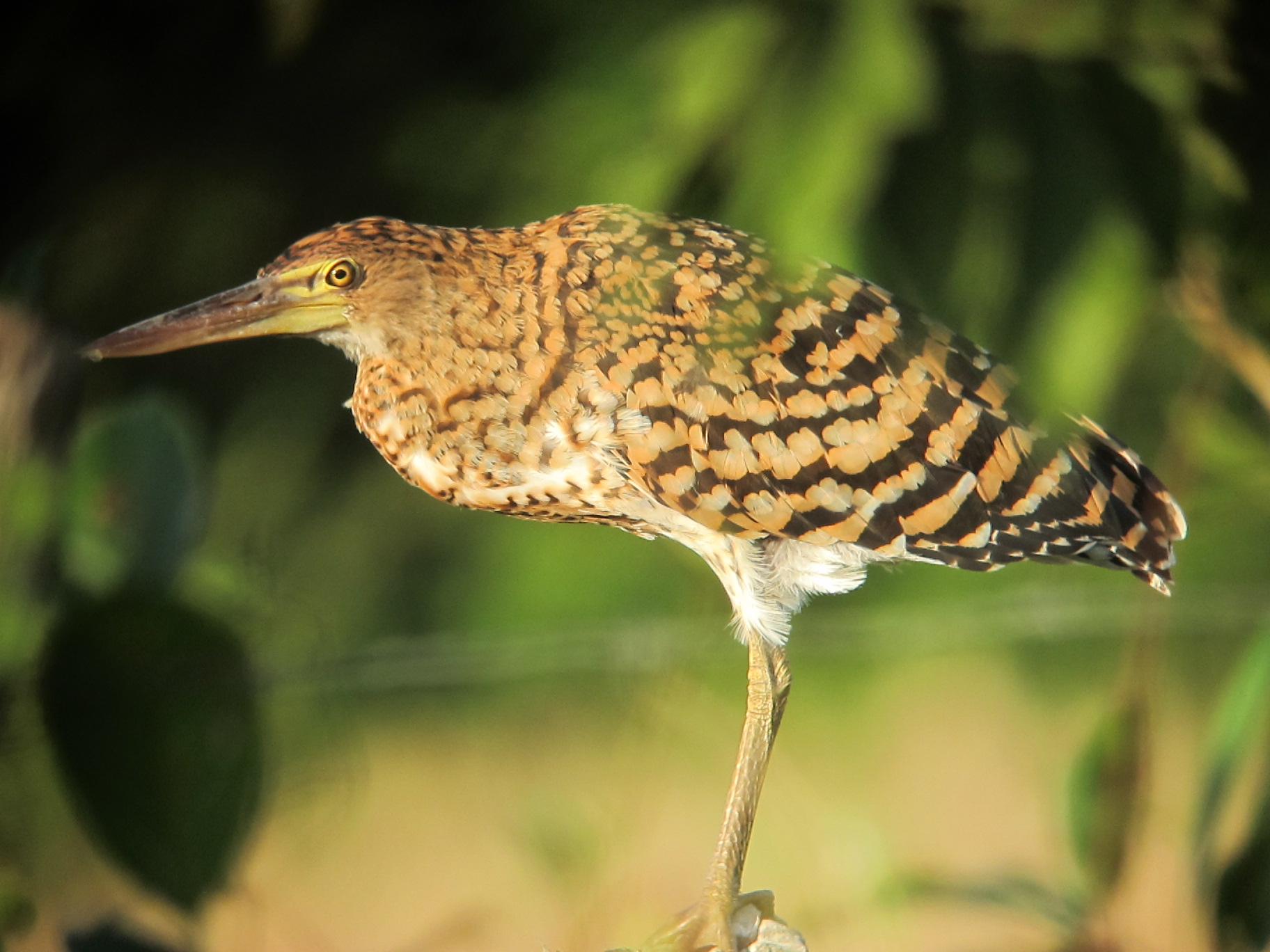
Pinnated bittern

Order: Pelecaniformes Family: Ardeidae

- Rufescent tiger heron (Tigrisoma lineatum)
- Boat-billed heron (Cochlearius cochlearius)
- Pinnated bittern (Botaurus pinnatus)
- Stripe-backed bittern (Ixobrychus involucris)
- Least bittern (Ixobrychus exilis)
- Black-crowned night heron (Nycticorax nycticorax)
- Yellow-crowned night heron (Nyctanassa violacea)
- Striated heron (Butorides striata)
- Squacco heron (Ardeola ralloides) (A)
- Western cattle egret (Bubulcus ibis)
- Cocoi heron (Ardea cocoi)
- Great egret (Ardea alba)
- Capped heron (Pilherodius pileatus)
- Little blue heron (Egretta caerulea)
- Snowy egret (Egretta thula)

== Ibises and spoonbills ==
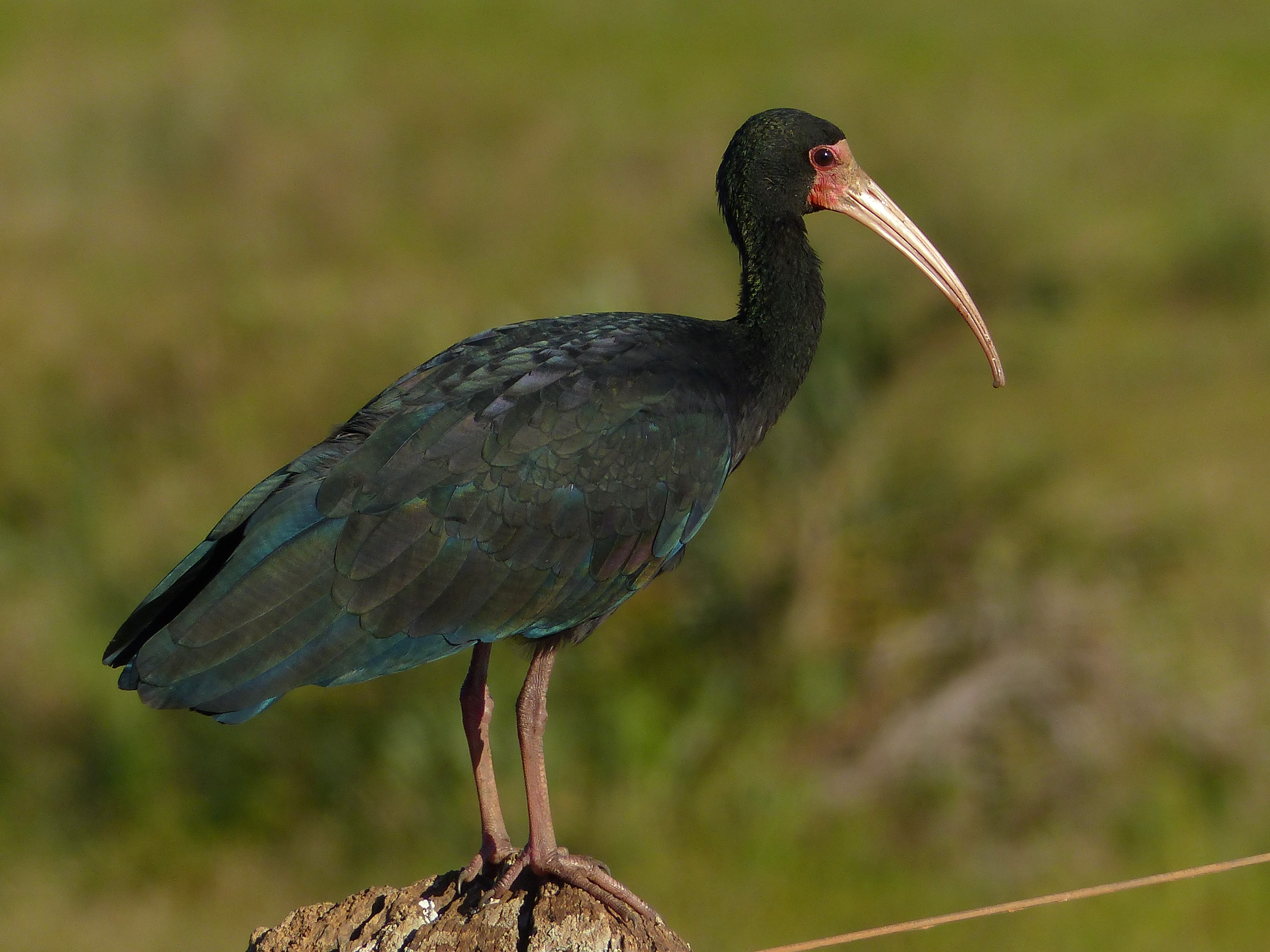
Bare-faced ibis

Order: Pelecaniformes Family: Threskiornithidae

- Roseate spoonbill (Platalea ajaja)
- Bare-faced ibis (Phimosus infuscatus)

== Frigatebirds ==
Order: Pelecaniformes Family: Fregatidae

- Magnificent frigatebird (Fregata magnificens)

== Boobies and gannets ==
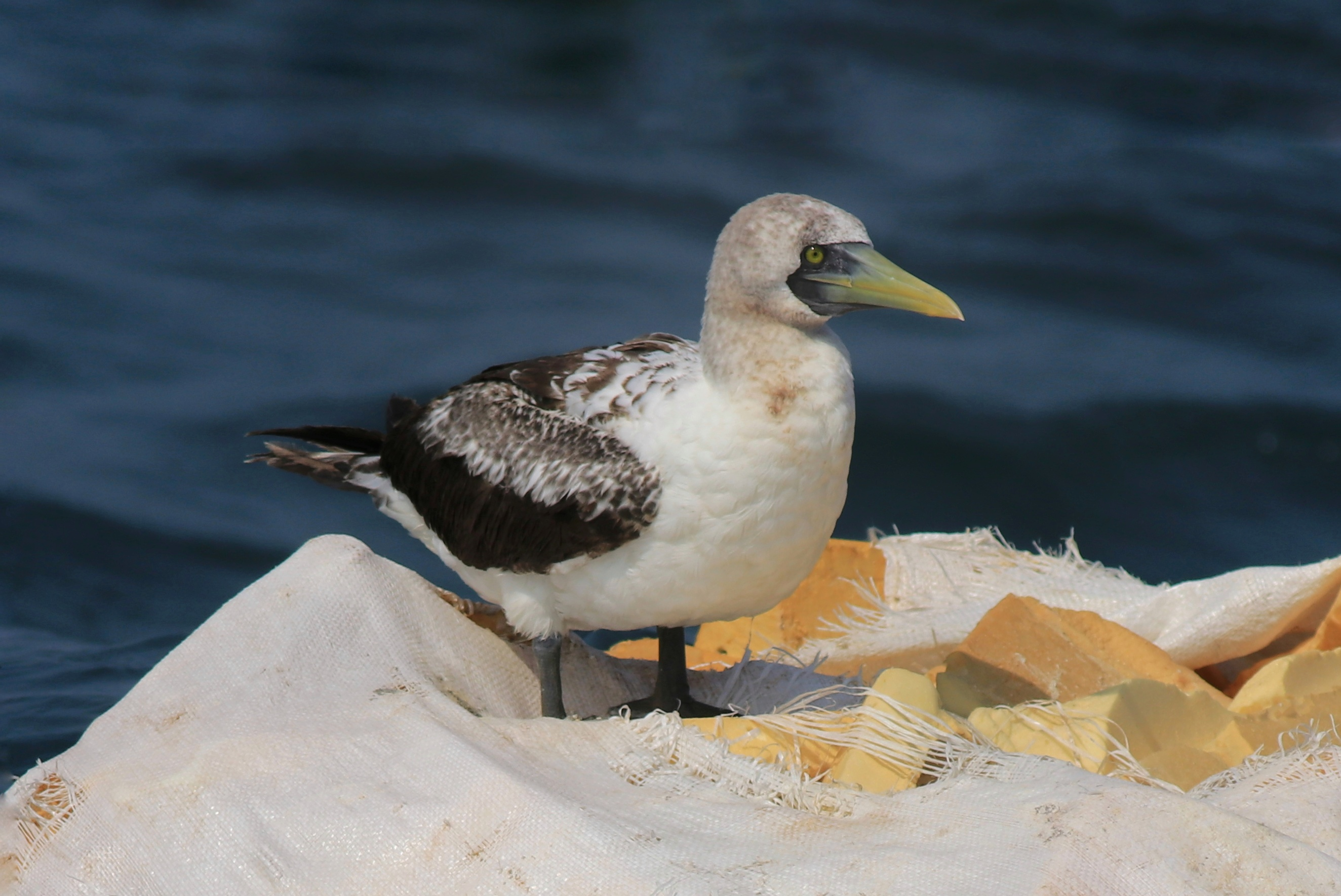
Masked booby

Order: Pelecaniformes Family: Sulidae

- Masked booby (Sula dactylatra)
- Red-footed booby (Sula sula)

== Cormorants ==
Order: Pelecaniformes Family: Phalacrocoracidae

- Neotropic cormorant (Phalacrocorax brasilianus)

== Anhingas ==
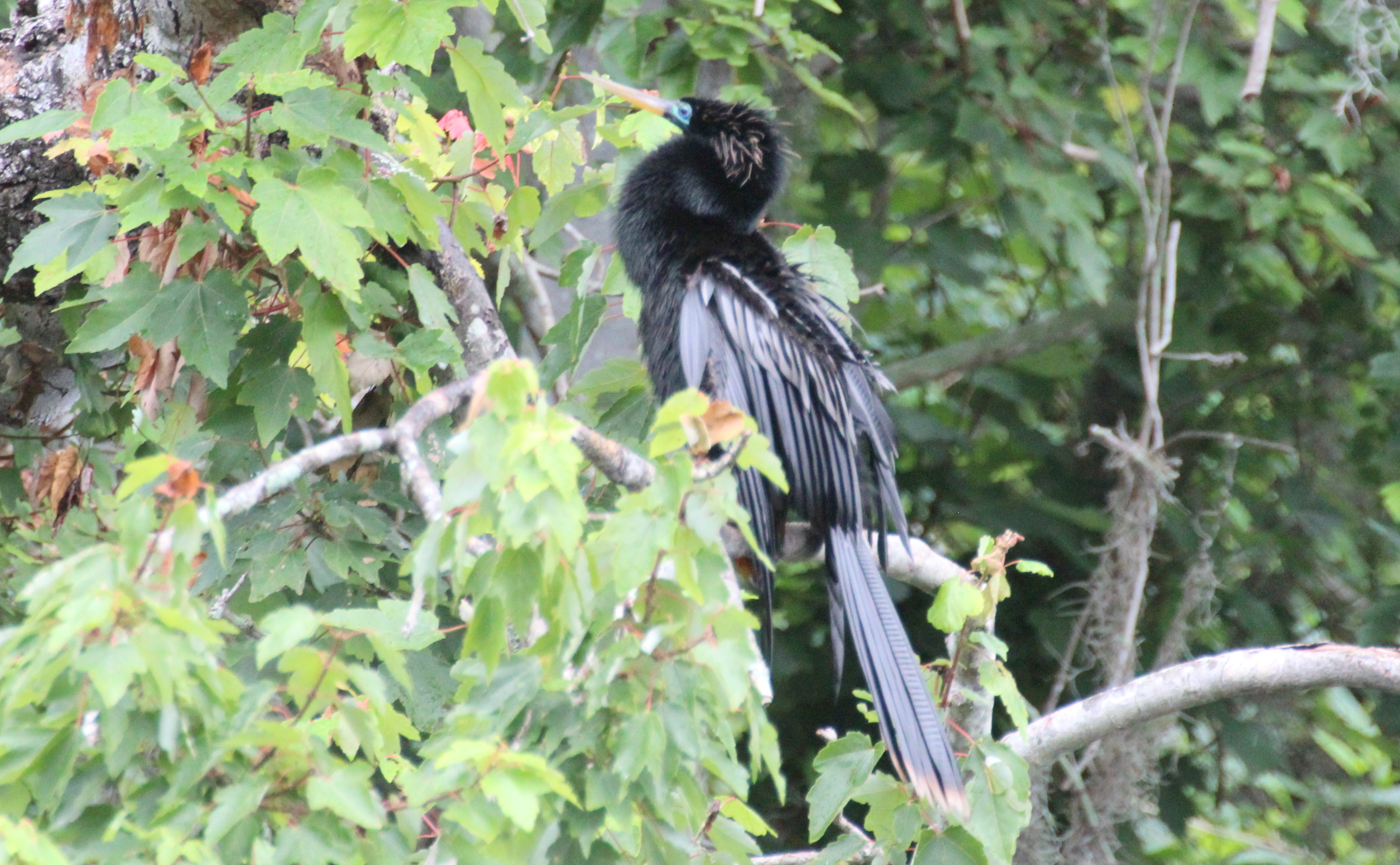
Anhinga

Order: Pelecaniformes Family: Anhingidae

- Anhinga (Anhinga anhinga)

== Sheathbills ==
Order: Charadriiformes Family: Chionidae

- Snowy sheathbill (Chionis albus) (A)

== Oystercatchers ==
Order: Charadriiformes Family: Haematopodidae

- American oystercatcher (Haematopus palliatus) (A)

== Stilts and avocets ==
Order: Charadriiformes Family: Recurvirostridae

- Black-necked stilt (Himantopus mexicanus)

== Plovers and lapwings ==
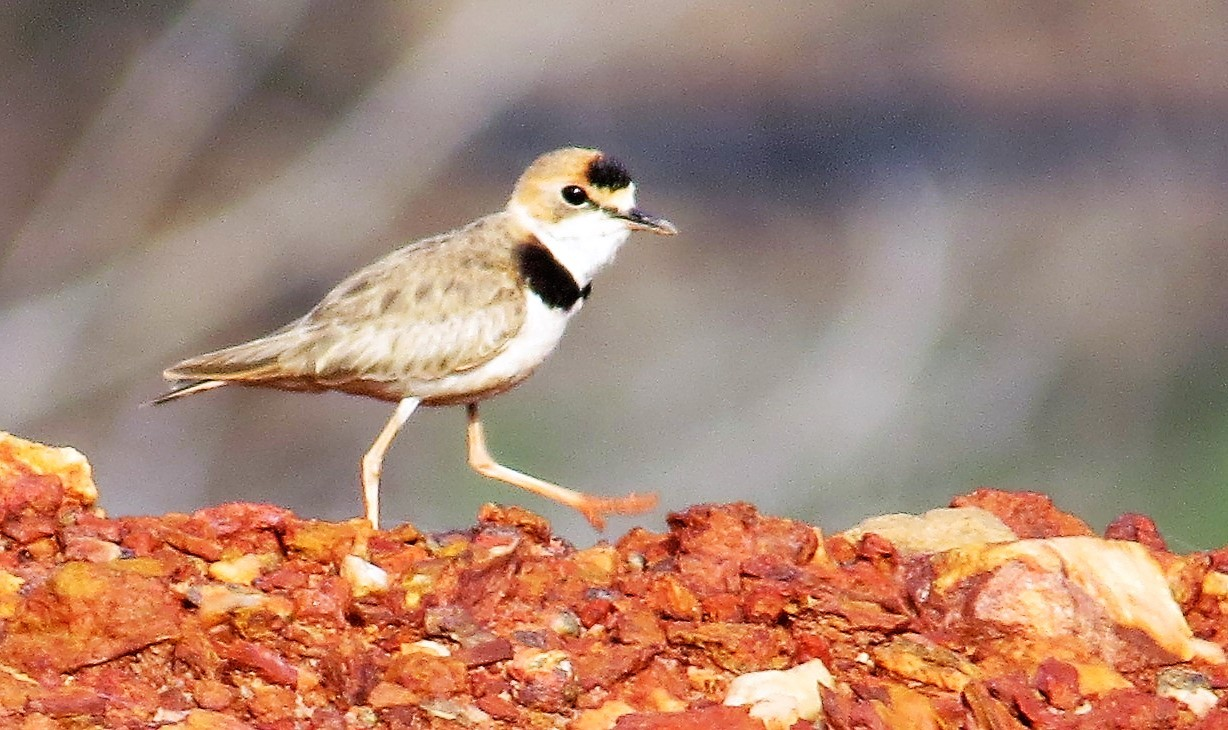
Collared plover

Order: Charadriiformes Family: Charadriidae

- Black-bellied plover (Pluvialis squatarola)
- American golden plover (Pluvialis dominica)
- Semipalmated plover (Charadrius semipalmatus)
- Wilson's plover (Charadrius wilsonia)
- Collared plover (Charadrius collaris)
- Southern lapwing (Vanellus chilensis)
- Pied lapwing (Vanellus cayanus)

== Jacanas ==
Order: Charadriiformes Family: Jacanidae

- Wattled jacana (Jacana jacana)

== Sandpipers ==
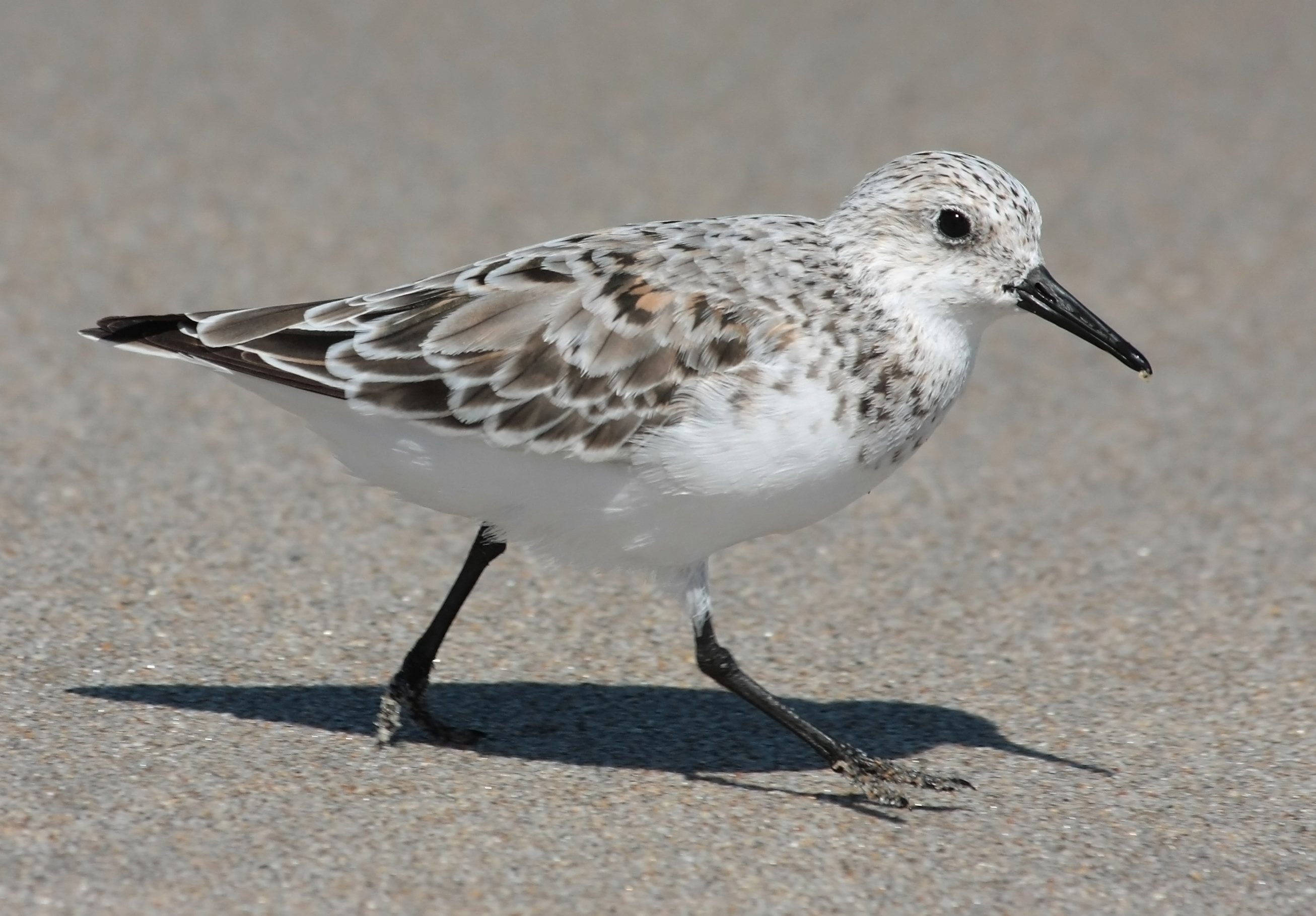
Sanderling

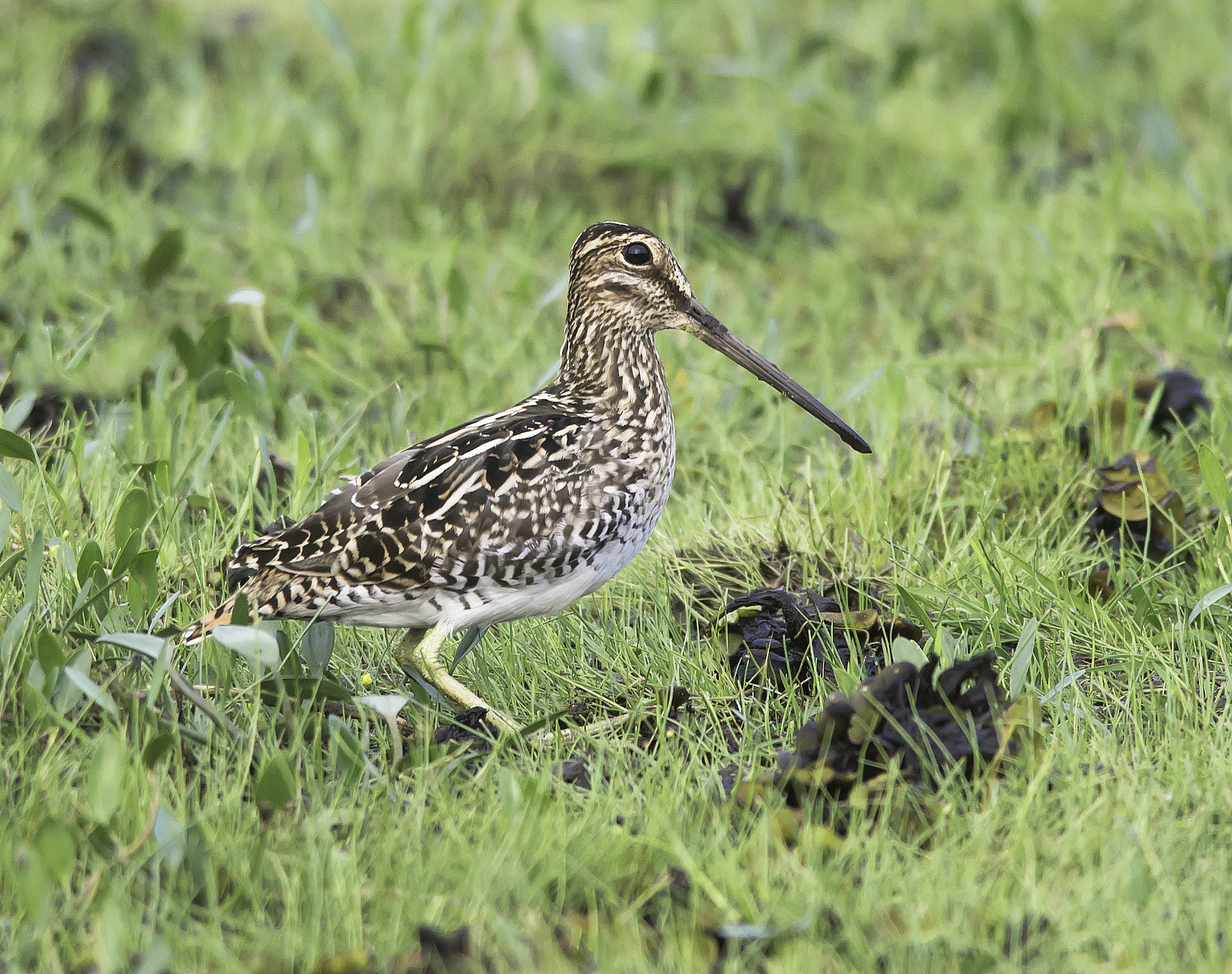
Pantanal snipe

Order: Charadriiformes Family: Scolopacidae

- Whimbrel (Numenius phaeopus)
- Bar-tailed godwit (Limosa lapponica) (A)
- Ruddy turnstone (Arenaria interpres)
- Red knot (Calidris canutus) (A)
- Sanderling (Calidris alba)
- Least sandpiper (Calidris minutilla)
- White-rumped sandpiper (Calidris fuscicollis)
- Pectoral sandpiper (Calidris melanotos)
- Semipalmated sandpiper (Calidris pusilla)
- Short-billed dowitcher (Limnodromus griseus) (A)
- Pantanal snipe (Gallinago paraguaiae)
- Giant snipe (Gallinago undulata)
- Spotted sandpiper (Actitis macularius)
- Solitary sandpiper (Tringa solitaria)
- Willet (Tringa semipalmata)
- Lesser yellowlegs (Tringa flavipes)
- Greater yellowlegs (Tringa melanoleuca)

== Skuas and jaegers ==
Order: Charadriiformes Family: Stercorariidae

- Parasitic jaeger (Stercorarius parasiticus) (A)
- Pomarine jaeger (Stercorarius pomarinus) (A)
- Great skua (Stercorarius skua) (A)
- South polar skua (Stercorarius maccormicki) (A)

== Gulls, terns, and skimmers ==
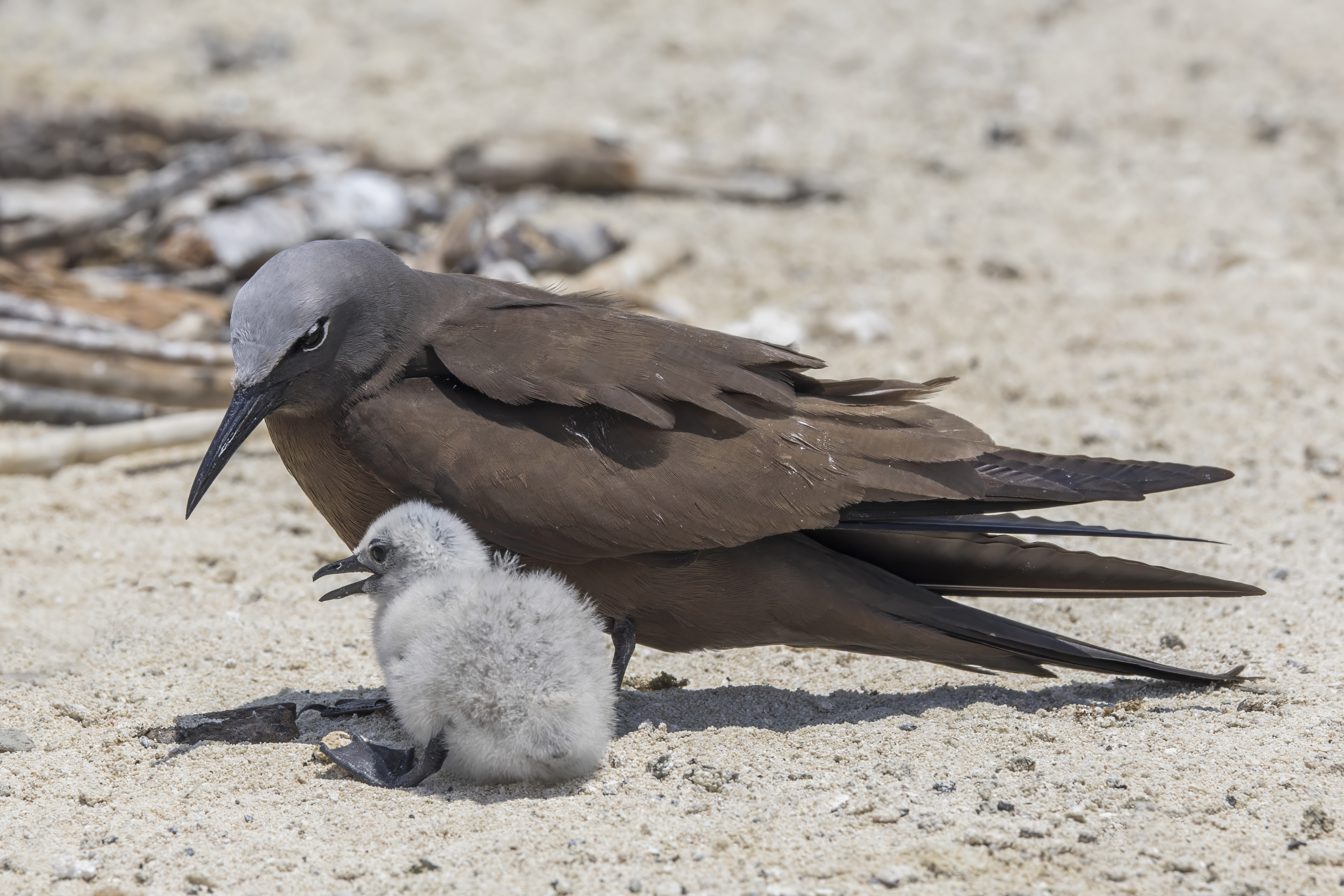
Brown noddy

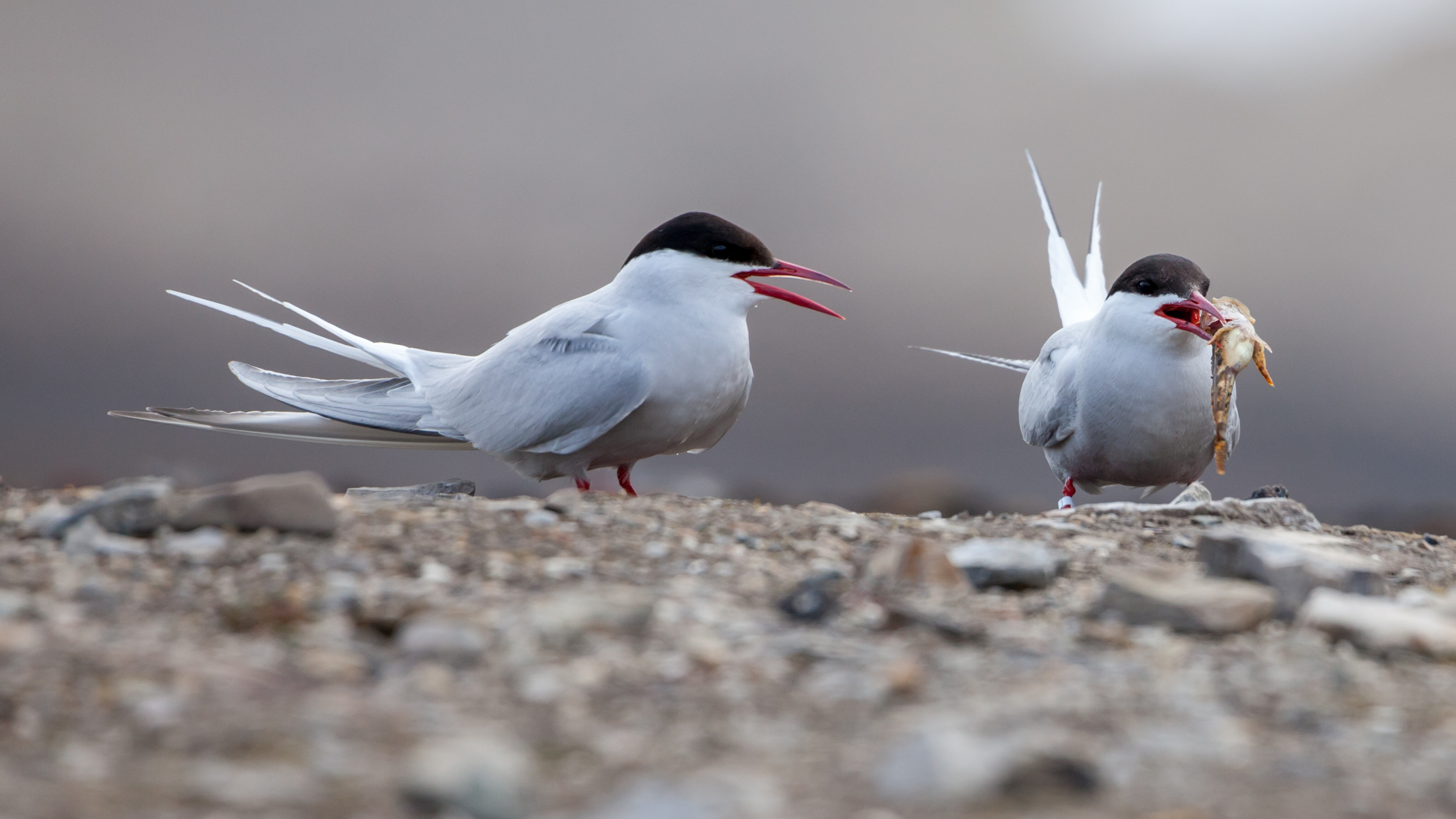
Arctic tern

Order: Charadriiformes Family: Laridae

- Brown noddy (Anous stolidus)
- Black noddy (Anous minutus)
- Black skimmer (Rynchops niger)
- Brown-hooded gull (Chroicocephalus maculipennis) (A)
- Grey-hooded gull (Chroicocephalus cirrocephalus) (A)
- Laughing gull (Leucophaeus atricilla)
- Franklin's gull (Leucophaeus pipixcan) (A)
- Kelp gull (Larus dominicanus) (A)
- Sooty tern (Onychoprion fuscatus)
- Yellow-billed tern (Sternula superciliaris)
- Black tern (Chlidonias niger) (A)
- Roseate tern (Sterna dougallii)
- South American tern (Sterna hirundinacea) (A)
- Common tern (Sterna hirundo)
- Arctic tern (Sterna paradisaea)
- Cabot's tern (Thalasseus acuflavidus)

== New World vultures ==
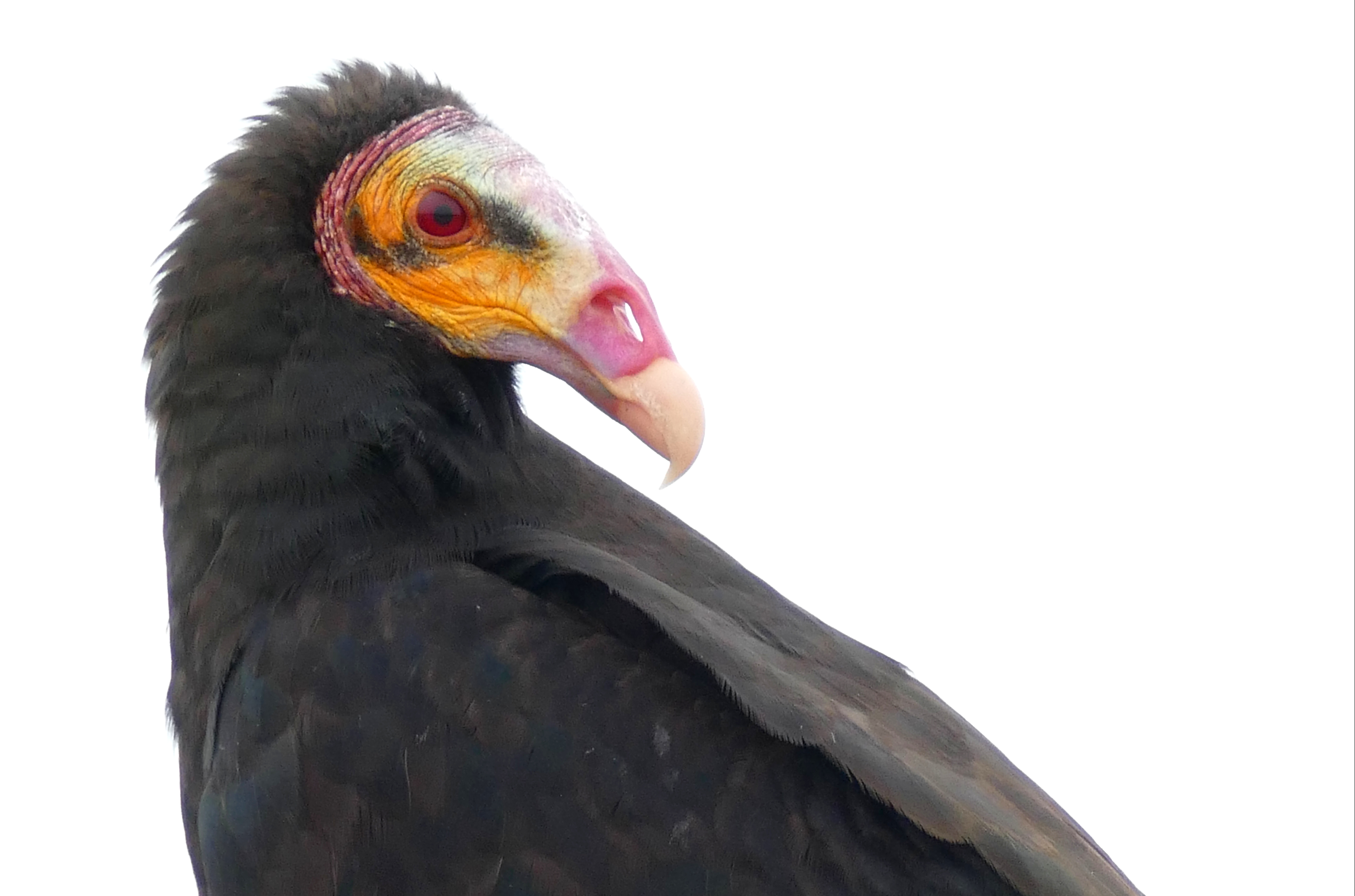
Lesser yellow-headed vulture

Order: Cathartiformes Family: Cathartidae

- Turkey vulture (Cathartes aura)
- Lesser yellow-headed vulture (Cathartes burrovianus)
- Black vulture (Coragyps atratus)
- King vulture (Sarcoramphus papa)
- Andean condor (Vultur gryphus) (A)

== Ospreys ==
Order: Accipitriformes Family: Pandionidae

- Osprey (Pandion haliaetus)

== Hawks ==
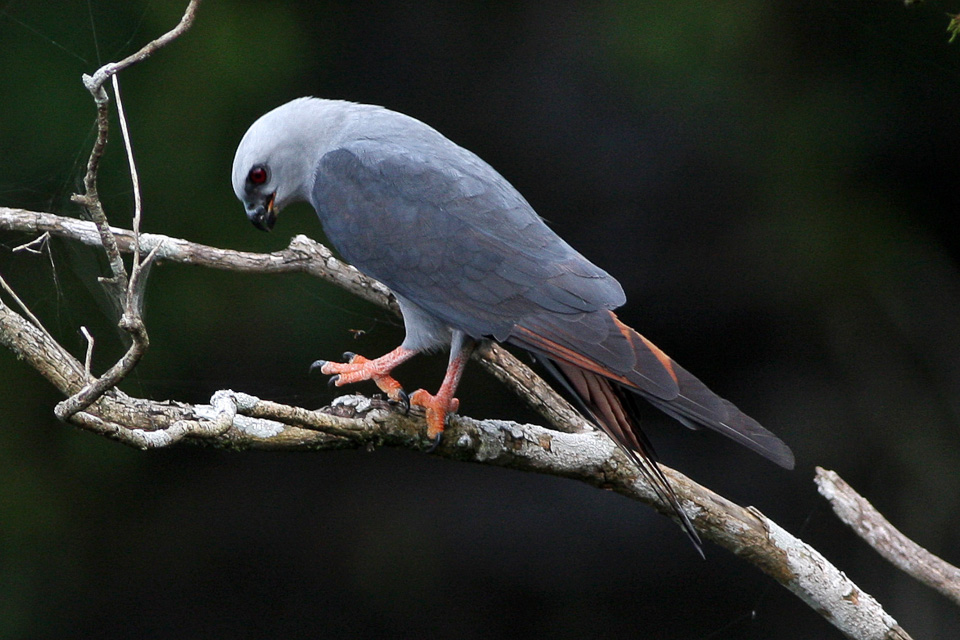
Plumbeous kite

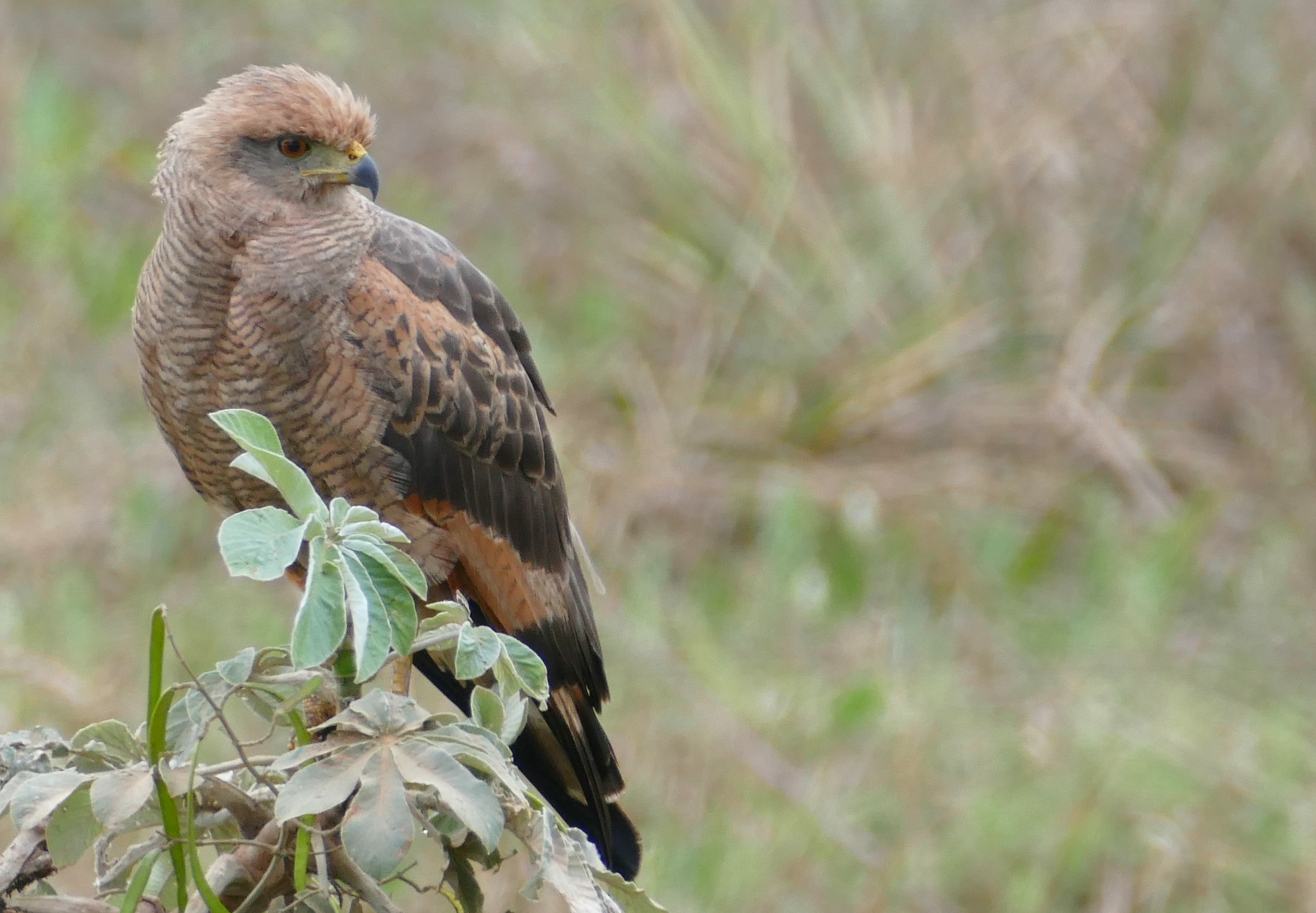
Savanna hawk

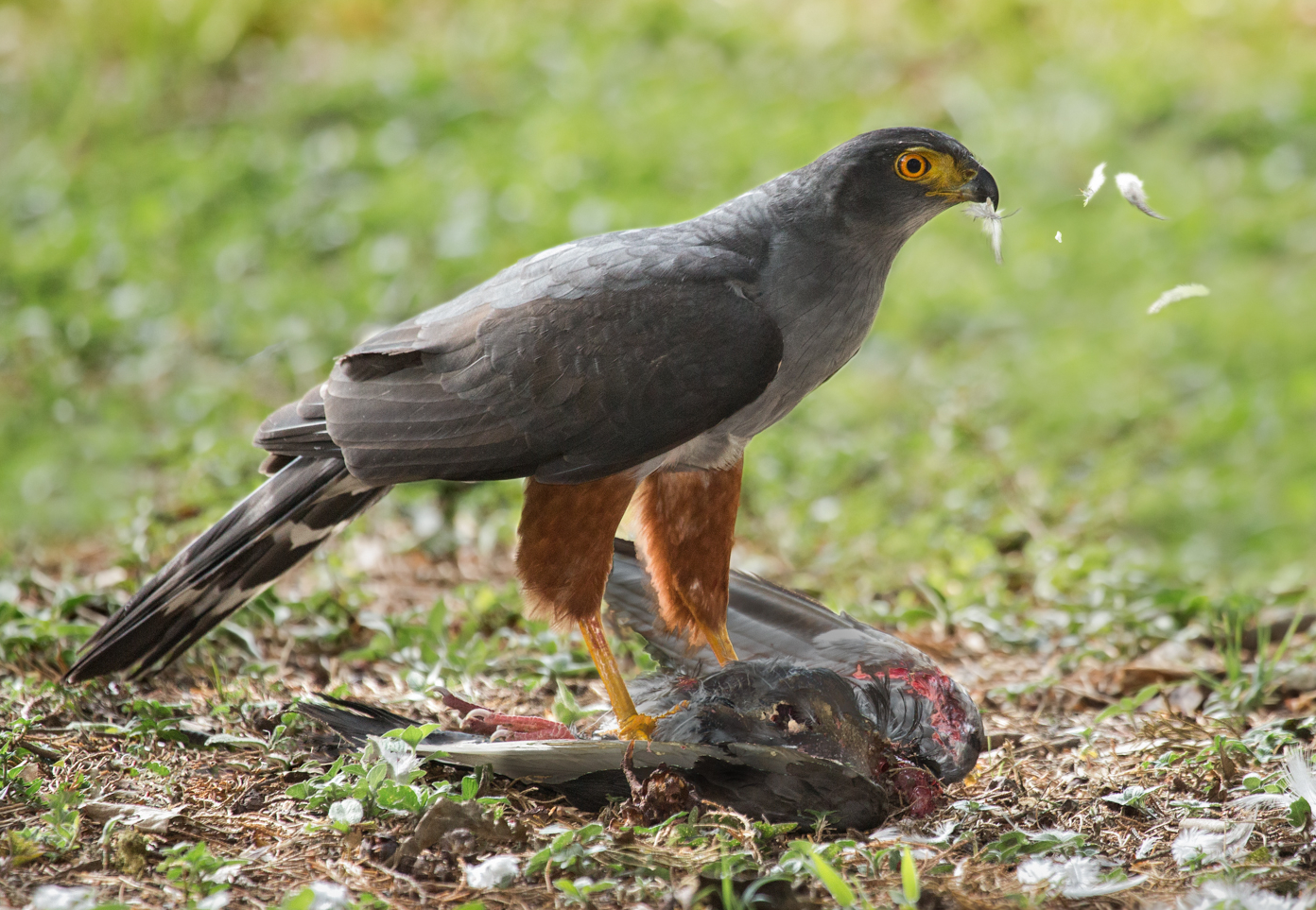
Bicolored hawk

Order: Accipitriformes Family: Accipitridae

- White-tailed kite (Elanus leucurus)
- Pearl kite (Gampsonyx swainsonii)
- White-collared kite (Leptodon forbesi) (EB)
- Hook-billed kite (Chondrohierax uncinatus)
- Swallow-tailed kite (Elanoides forficatus)
- Black hawk-eagle (Spizaetus tyrannus)
- Double-toothed kite (Harpagus bidentatus)
- Sharp-shinned hawk (Accipiter striatus)
- Bicolored hawk (Accipiter bicolor)
- Crane hawk (Geranospiza caerulescens)
- Plumbeous kite (Ictinia plumbea)
- Snail kite (Rostrhamus sociabilis)
- Roadside hawk (Rupornis magnirostris)
- Harris's hawk (Parabuteo unicinctus)
- Rufous crab hawk (Buteogallus aequinoctialis)
- Savanna hawk (Buteogallus meridionalis)
- Great black hawk (Buteogallus urubitinga)
- White-tailed hawk (Geranoaetus albicaudatus)
- Black-chested buzzard-eagle (Geranoaetus melanoleucus)
- Mantled hawk (Pseudastur polionotus)
- Grey-lined hawk (Buteo nitidus)
- Short-tailed hawk (Buteo brachyurus)
- Zone-tailed hawk (Buteo albonotatus)

== Barn owls ==
Order: Strigiformes Family: Tytonidae

- Barn owl (Tyto alba)

== Owls ==
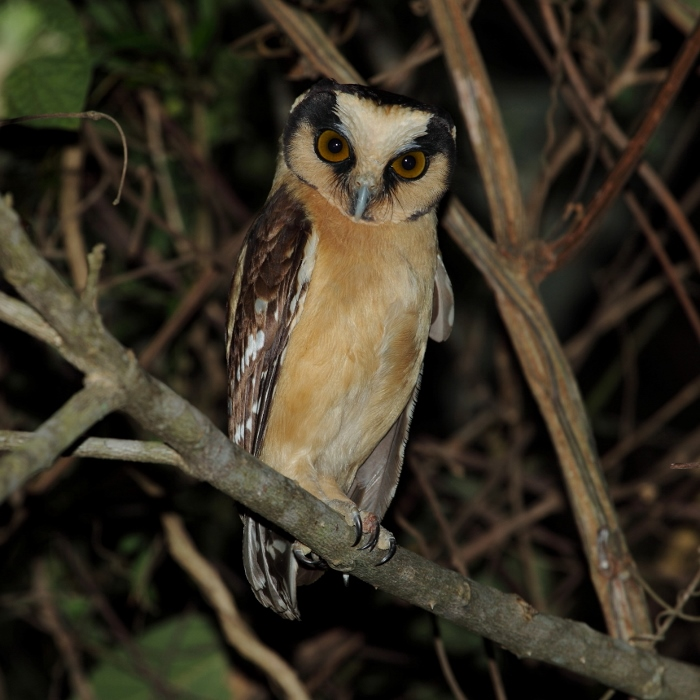
Buff-fronted owl

Order: Strigiformes Family: Strigidae

- Ferruginous pygmy owl (Glaucidium brasilianum)
- Burrowing owl (Athene cunicularia)
- Buff-fronted owl (Aegolius harrisii)
- Striped owl (Asio clamator)
- Tropical screech owl (Megascops choliba)
- Alagoas screech owl (Megascops alagoensis) (ES)
- Black-capped screech owl (Megascops atricapilla)
- Spectacled owl (Pulsatrix perspicillata)
- Great horned owl (Bubo virginianus)

== Trogons ==
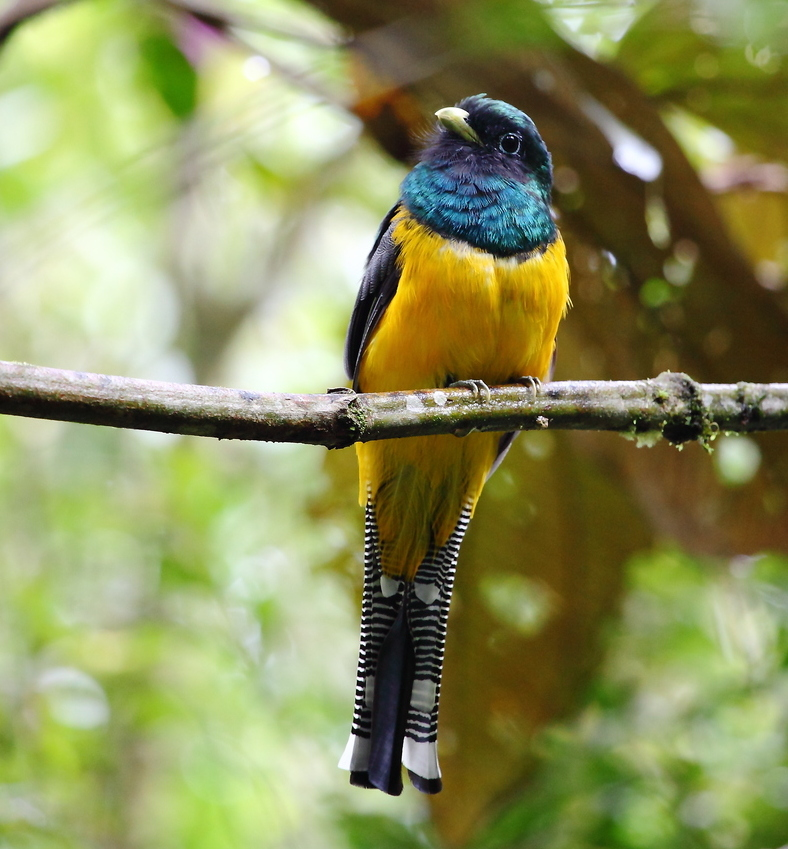
Atlantic black-throated trogon

Order: Trogoniformes Family: Trogonidae

- Atlantic black-throated trogon (Trogon chrysochloros)
- Green-backed trogon (Trogon viridis)
- Blue-crowned trogon (Trogon curucui)
- Collared trogon (Trogon collaris)

== Jacamars ==
Order: Piciformes Family: Galbulidae

- Rufous-tailed jacamar (Galbula ruficauda)

== Puffbirds ==
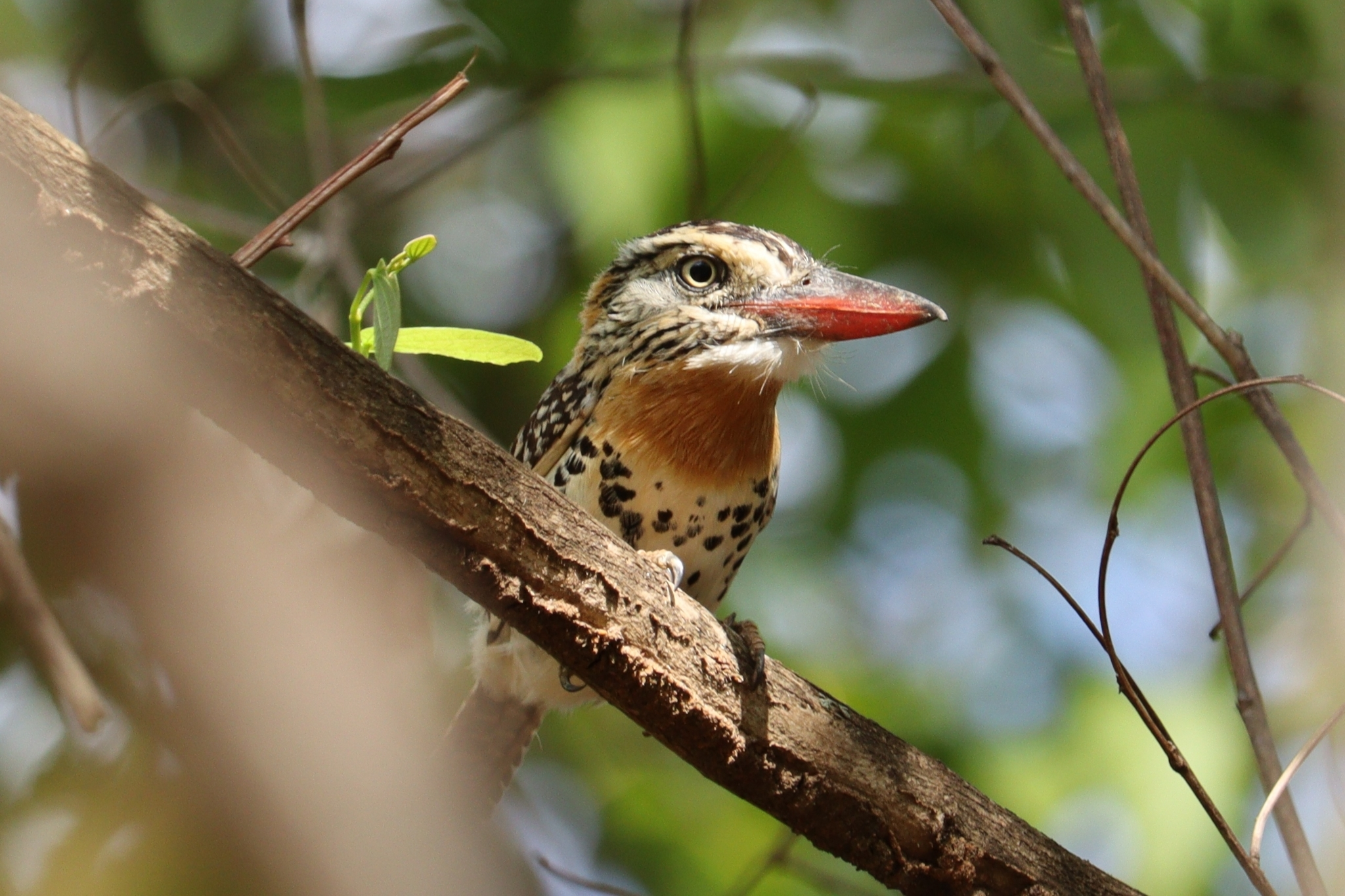
Caatinga puffbird

Order: Piciformes Family: Bucconidae

- White-eared puffbird (Nystalus chacuru)
- Caatinga puffbird (Nystalus maculatus)
- Black-fronted nunbird (Monasa nigrifrons)
- Swallow-winged puffbird (Chelidoptera tenebrosa)

== Woodpeckers and piculets ==
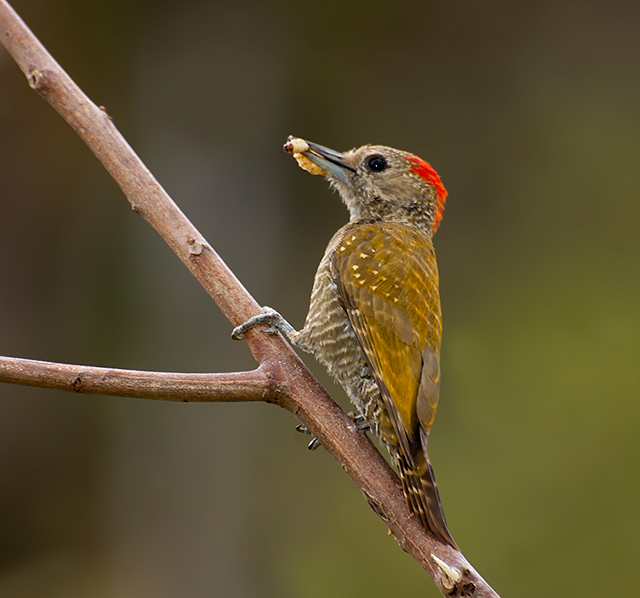
Little woodpecker

Order: Piciformes Family: Picidae

- Golden-spangled piculet (Picumnus exilis)
- Spotted piculet (Picumnus pygmaeus) (EB)
- Ochraceous piculet (Picumnus limae) (EB)
- Lineated woodpecker (Dryocopus lineatus)
- Ochre-backed woodpecker (Celeus ochraceus) (EB)
- Yellow-throated woodpecker (Piculus flavigula)
- Golden-green woodpecker (Piculus chrysochloros)
- Green-barred woodpecker (Colaptes melanochloros)
- Campo flicker (Colaptes campestris)
- Crimson-crested woodpecker (Campephilus melanoleucos)
- White woodpecker (Melanerpes candidus)
- Little woodpecker (Veniliornis passerinus)
- Red-stained woodpecker (Veniliornis affinis)

== Toucans ==
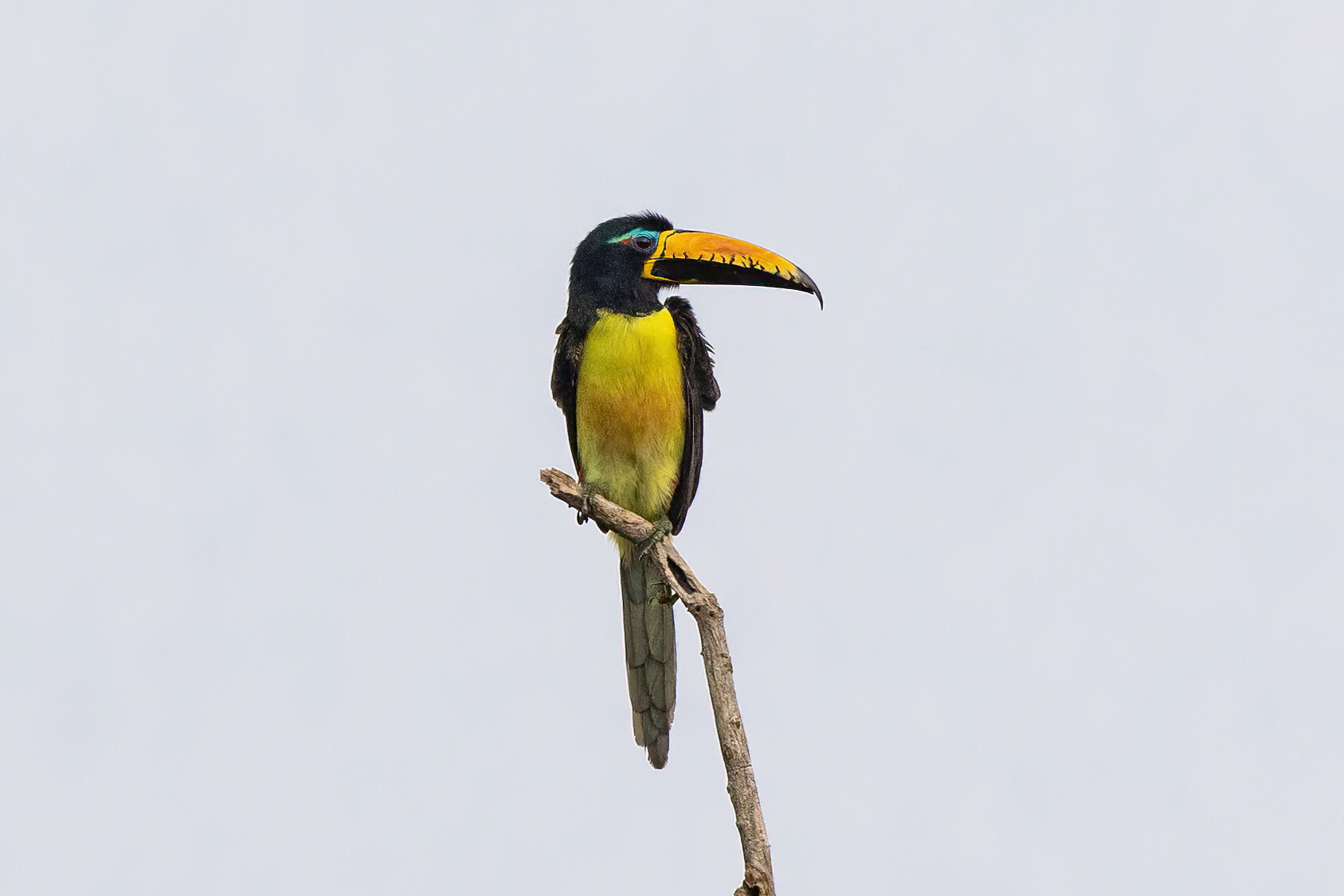
Lettered aracari

Order: Piciformes Family: Ramphastidae

- Channel-billed toucan (Ramphastos vitellinus)
- Lettered aracari (Pteroglossus inscriptus)
- Black-necked aracari (Pteroglossus aracari)

== Motmots ==
Order: Coraciiformes Family: Momotidae

- Amazonian motmot (Momotus momota)

== Kingfishers ==
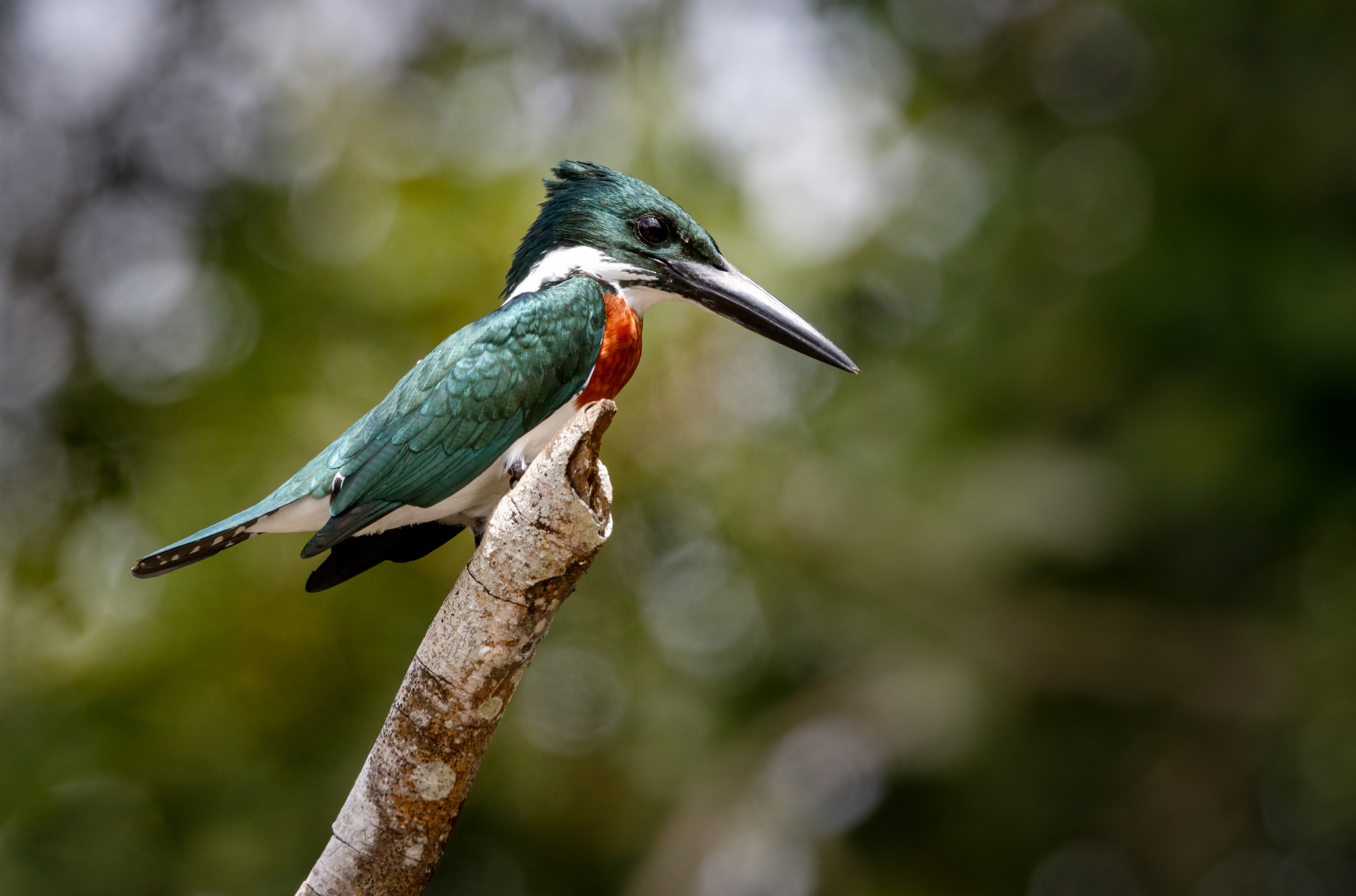
Amazon kingfisher

Order: Coraciiformes Family: Alcedinidae

- Ringed kingfisher (Megaceryle torquata)
- Amazon kingfisher (Chloroceryle amazona)
- Green kingfisher (Chloroceryle americana)

== Seriemas ==
Order: Cariamiformes Family: Cariamidae

- Red-legged seriema (Cariama cristata)

== Falcons ==
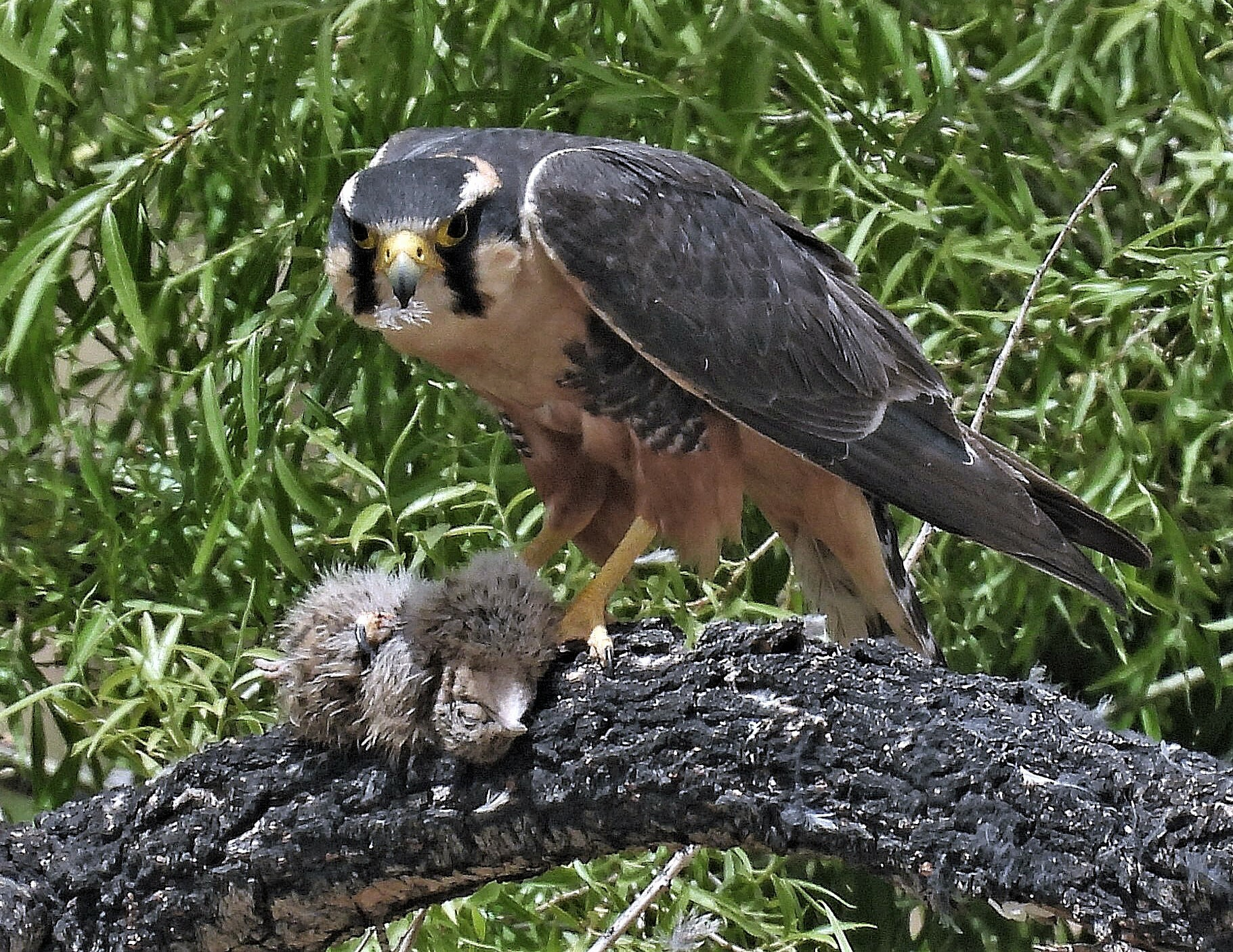
Aplomado falcon

Order: Falconiformes Family: Falconidae

- Laughing falcon (Herpetotheres cachinnans)
- Barred forest falcon (Micrastur ruficollis)
- Collared forest falcon (Micrastur semitorquatus)
- Southern caracara (Caracara plancus)
- Yellow-headed caracara (Milvago chimachima)
- American kestrel (Falco sparverius)
- Bat falcon (Falco rufigularis)
- Aplomado falcon (Falco femoralis)

== Parrots ==
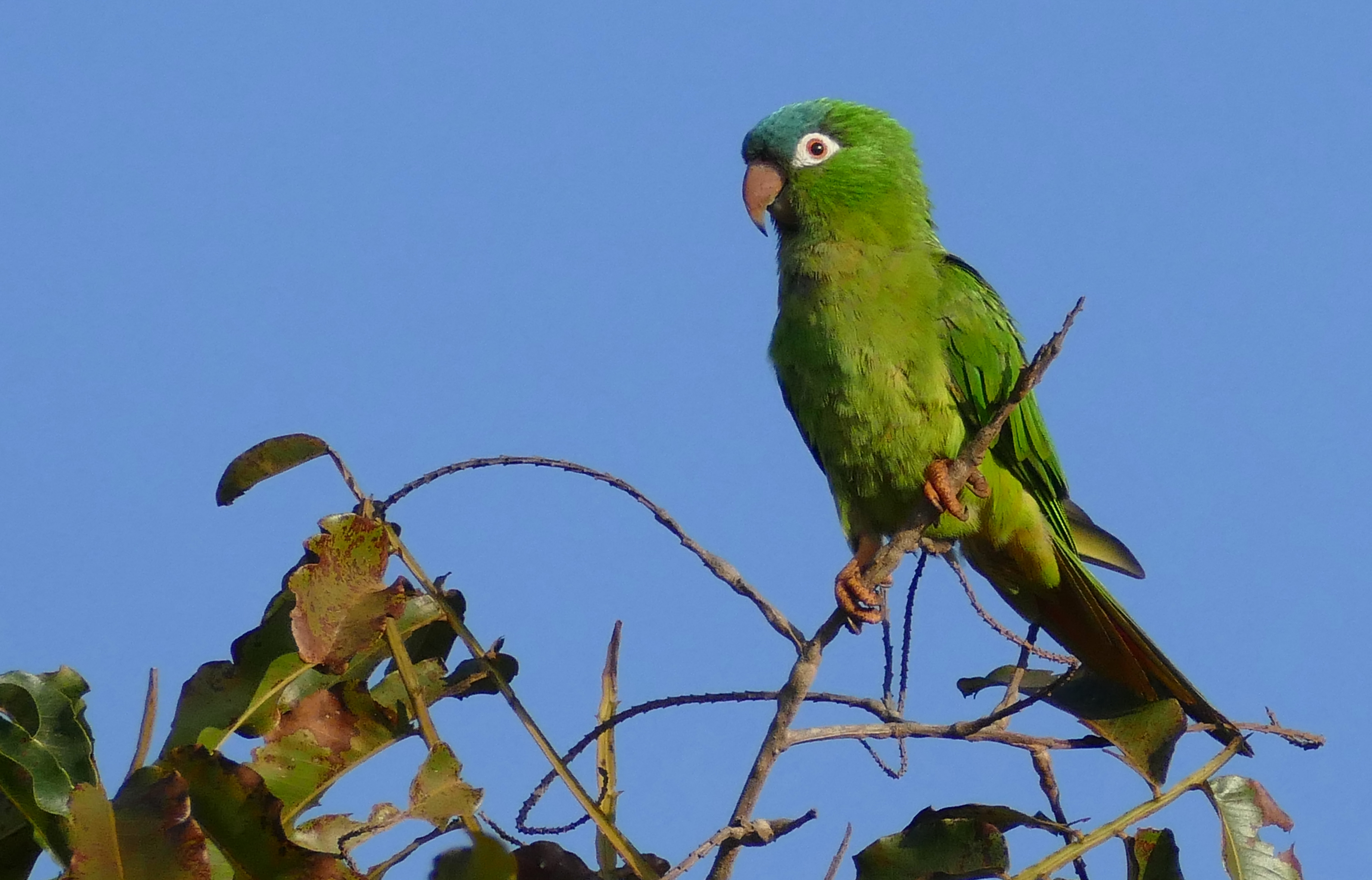
Blue-crowned parakeet

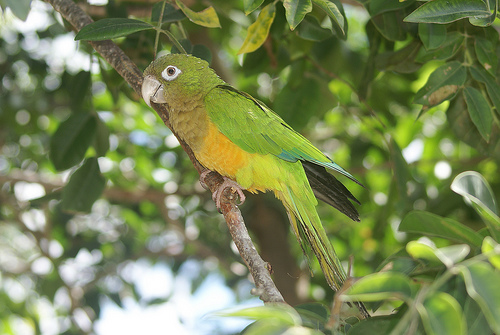
Cactus parakeet

Order: Psittaciformes Family: Psittacidae

- Golden-tailed parrotlet (Touit surdus) (EB)
- Plain parakeet (Brotogeris tirica) (EB)(A)
- Scaly-headed parrot (Pionus maximiliani)
- Blue-headed parrot (Pionus menstruus)
- Turquoise-fronted parrot (Amazona aestiva)
- Orange-winged parrot (Amazona amazonica)
- Blue-winged parrotlet (Forpus xanthopterygius)
- Indigo macaw (Anodorhynchus leari) (EB)
- Peach-fronted parakeet (Eupsittula aurea)
- Cactus parakeet (Eupsittula cactorum) (EB)
- Golden-capped parakeet (Aratinga auricapillus) (EB)
- Blue-winged macaw (Primolius maracana)
- Red-shouldered macaw (Diopsittaca nobilis)
- Blue-crowned parakeet (Psittacara acuticaudatus)

== Manakins ==
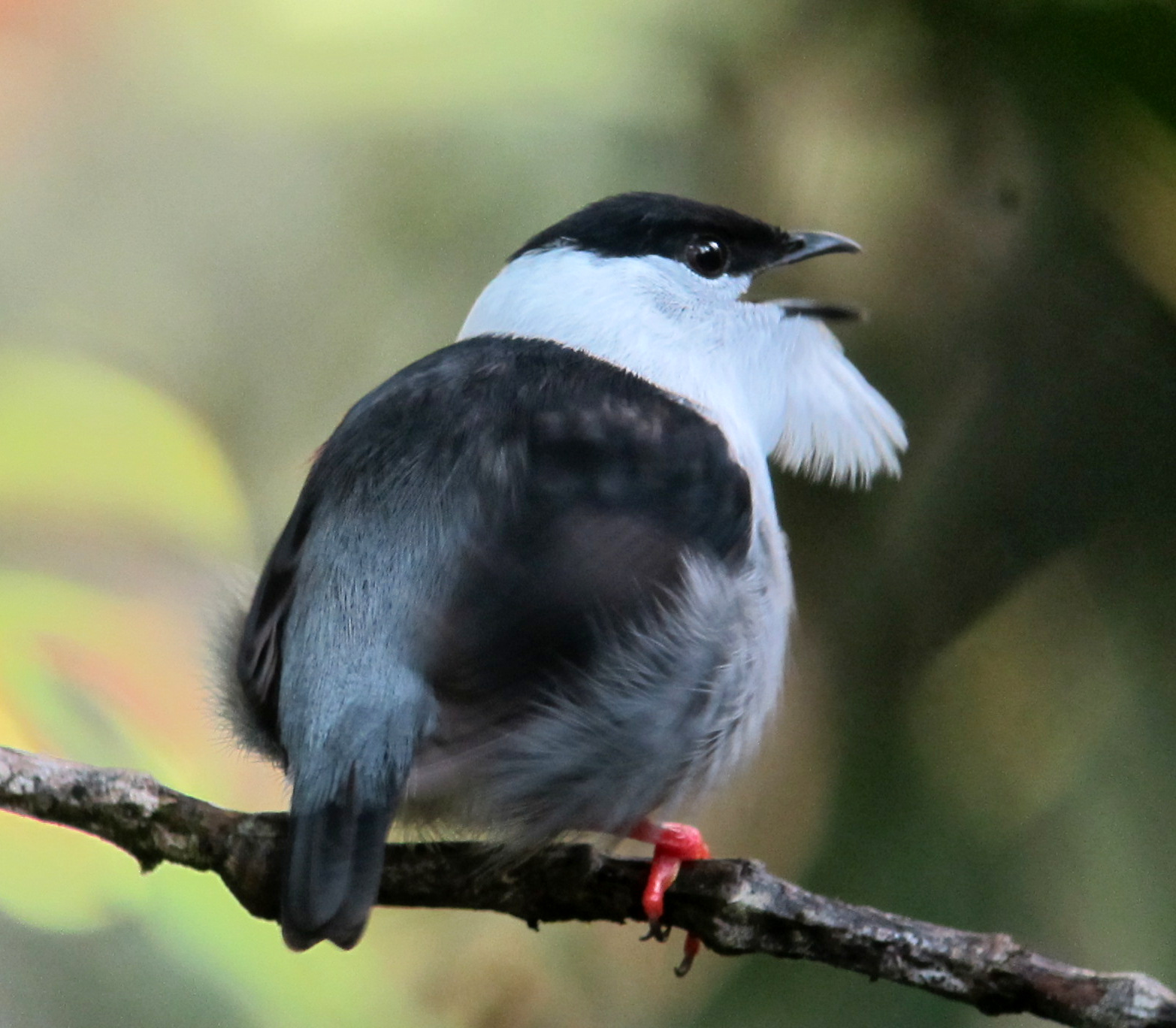
White-bearded manakin

Order: Passeriformes Family: Pipridae

- Pale-bellied tyrant manakin (Neopelma pallescens)
- White-bearded manakin (Manacus manacus)
- Red-headed manakin (Ceratopipra rubrocapilla)
- Blue-backed manakin (Chiroxiphia pareola)

== Cotingas ==
Order: Passeriformes Family: Cotingidae

- Black-headed berryeater (Carpornis melanocephala) (EB)
- Screaming piha (Lipaugus vociferans)
- Bearded bellbird (Procnias averano)
- White-winged cotinga (Xipholena atropurpurea) (EB)

== Tityras, mourners and allies ==
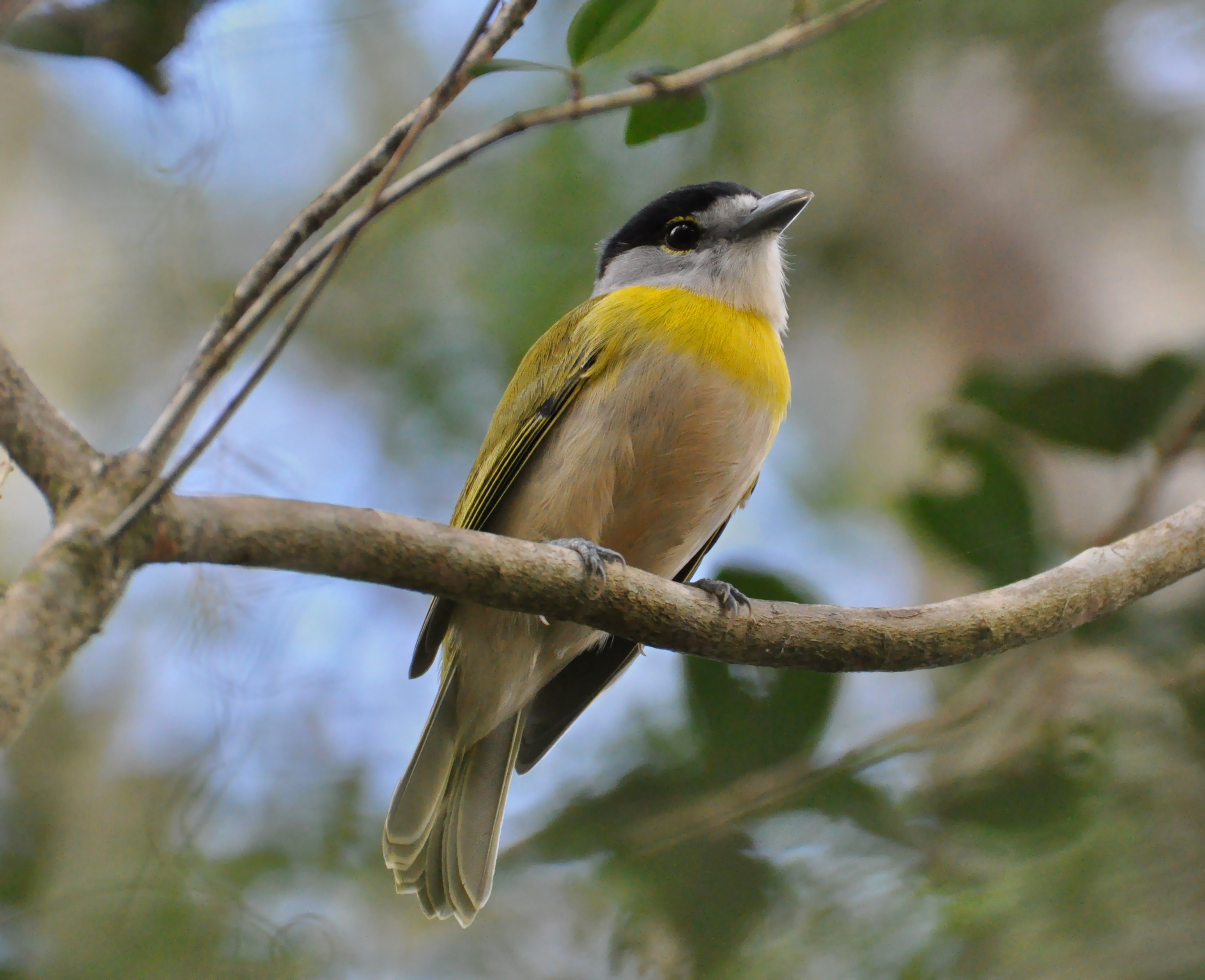
Green-backed becard

Order: Passeriformes Family: Tityridae

- Sharpbill (Oxyruncus cristatus)
- Buff-throated purpletuft (Iodopleura pipra) (EB)
- Black-crowned tityra (Tityra inquisitor)
- Black-tailed tityra (Tityra cayana)
- White-naped xenopsaris (Xenopsaris albinucha)
- Green-backed becard (Pachyramphus viridis)
- Crested becard (Pachyramphus validus)
- Black-capped becard (Pachyramphus marginatus)
- White-winged becard (Pachyramphus polychopterus)
- Brown-winged schiffornis (Schiffornis turdina)

== Tyrant flycatchers ==
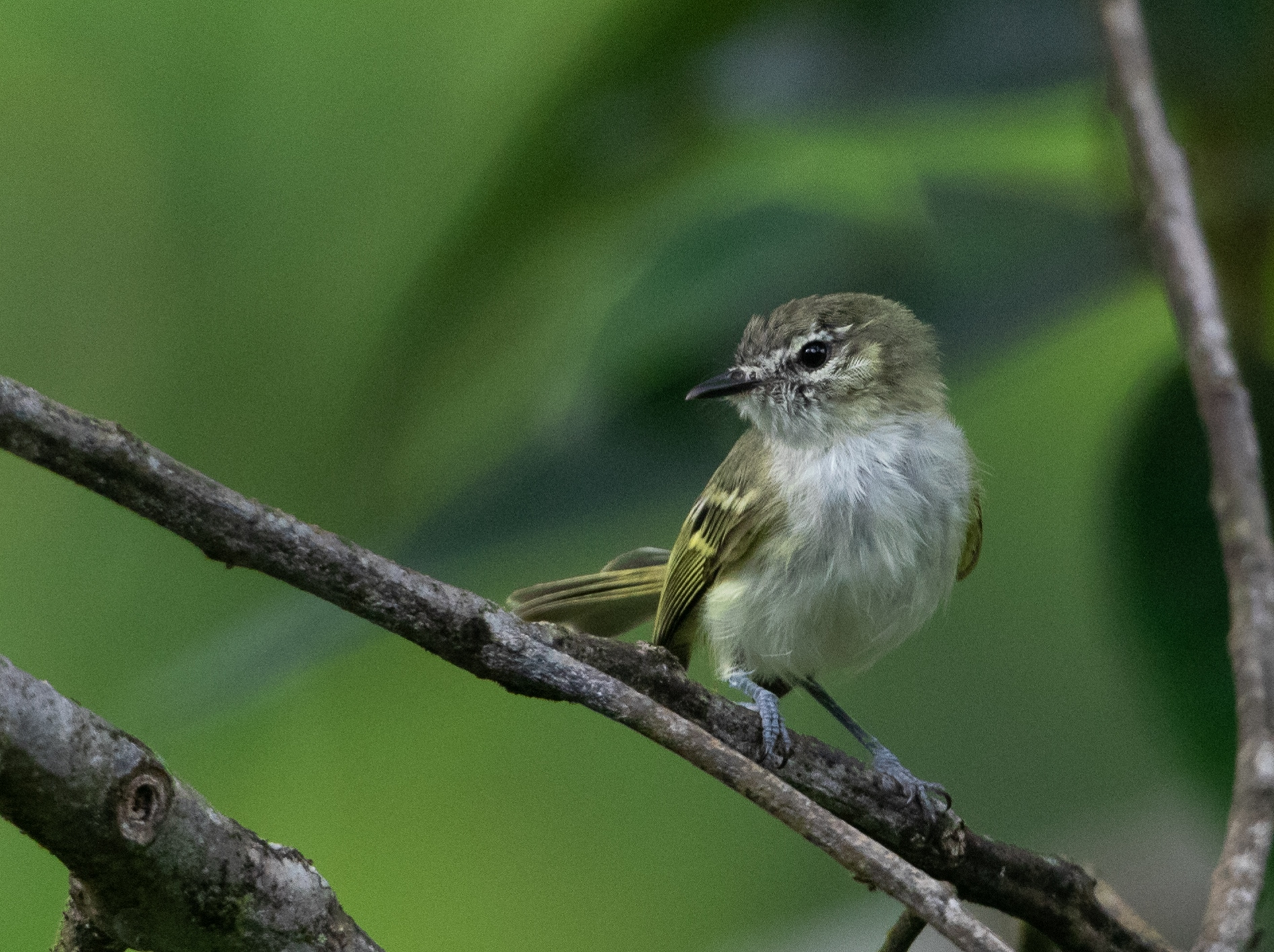
Alagoas tyrannulet

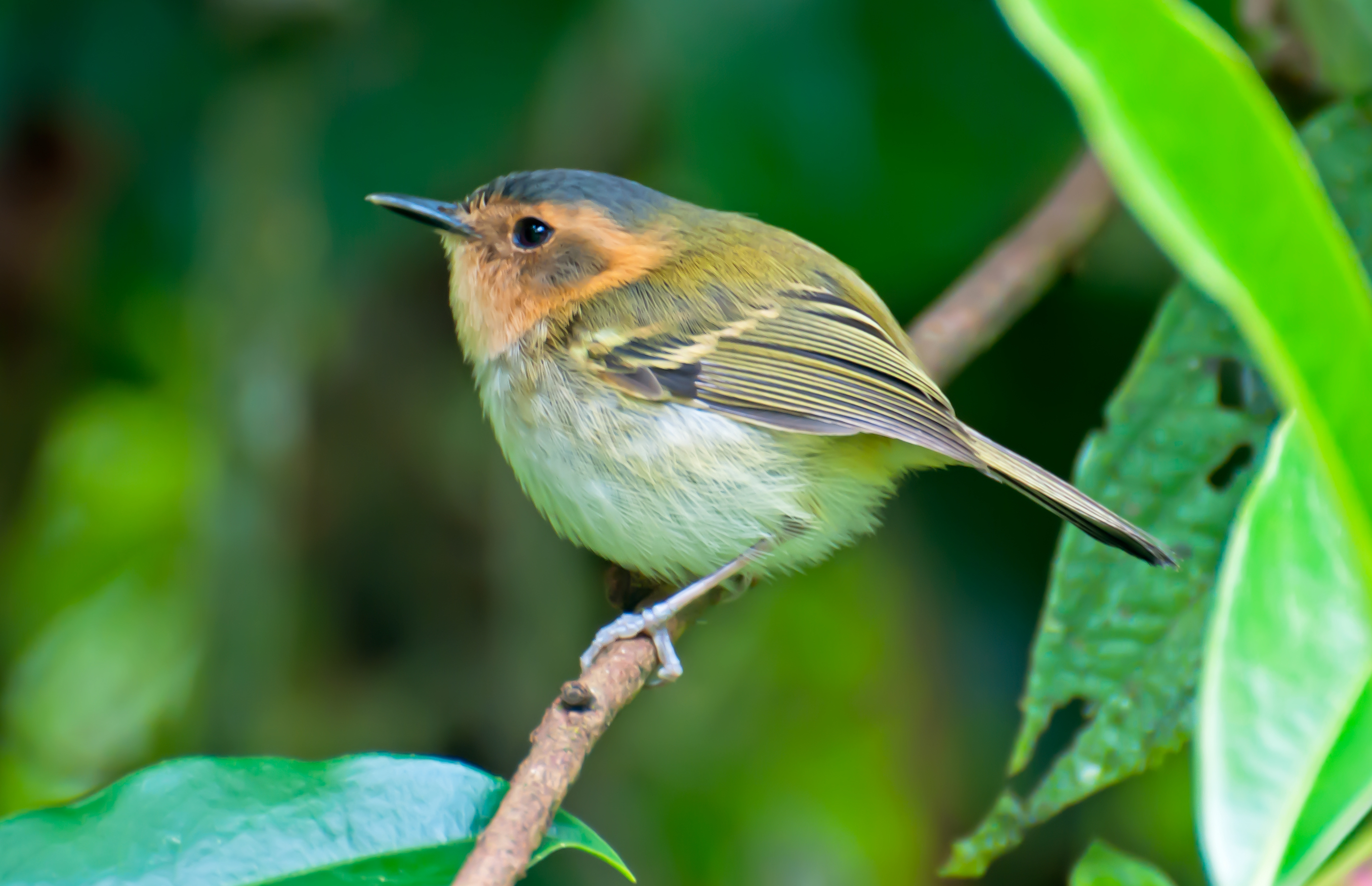
Ochre-faced tody flycatcher

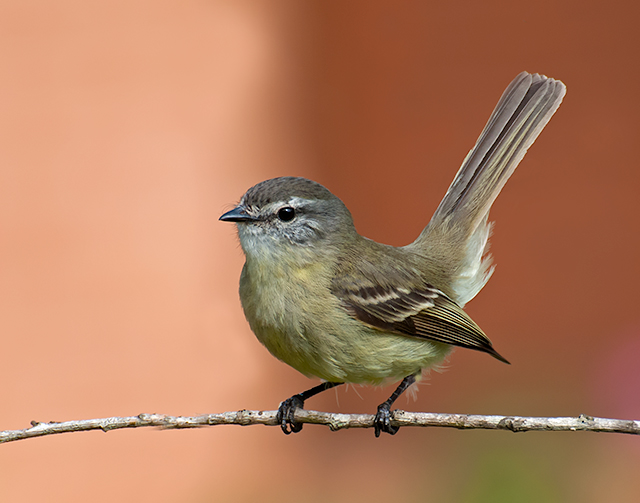
Planalto tyrannulet

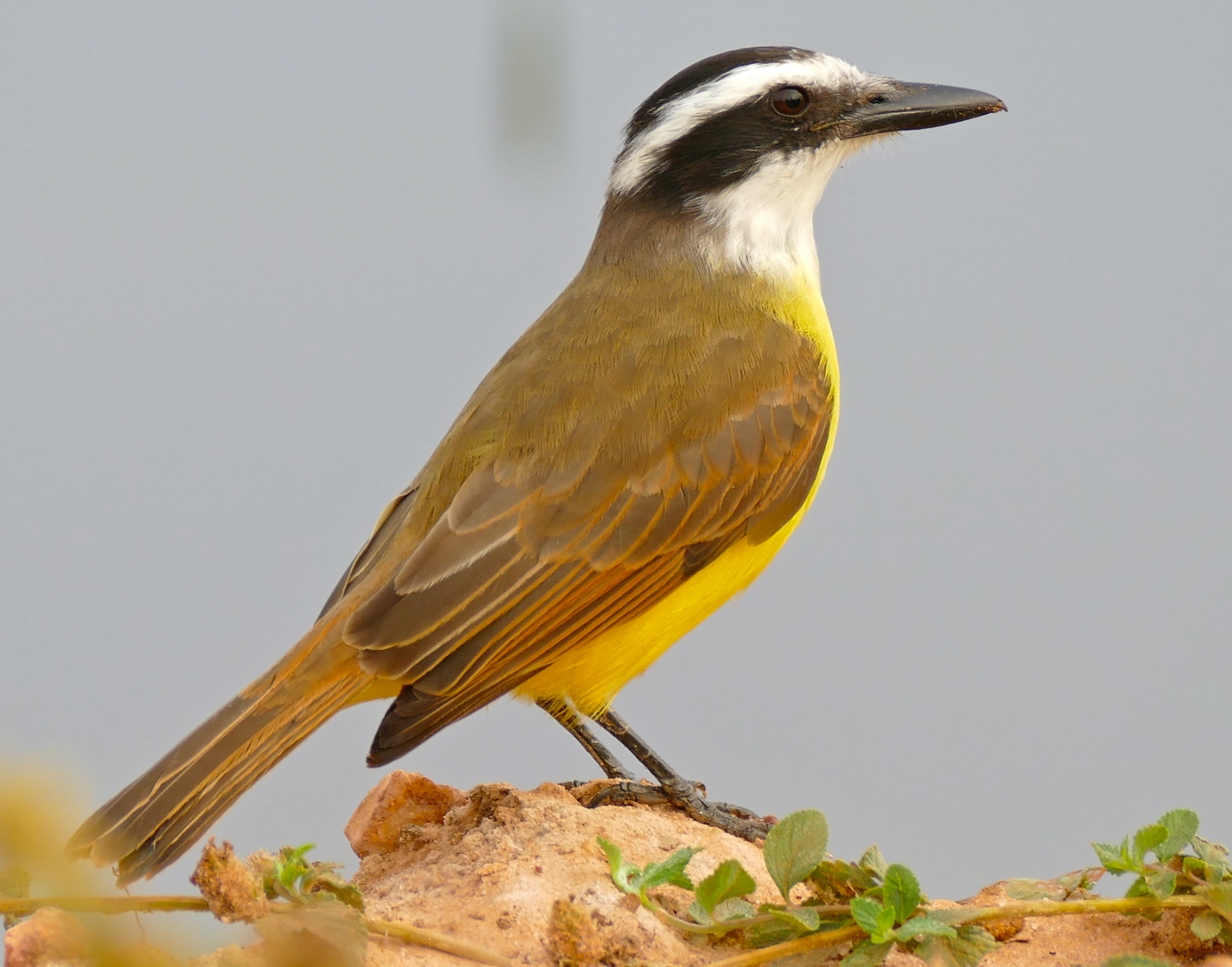
Great kiskadee

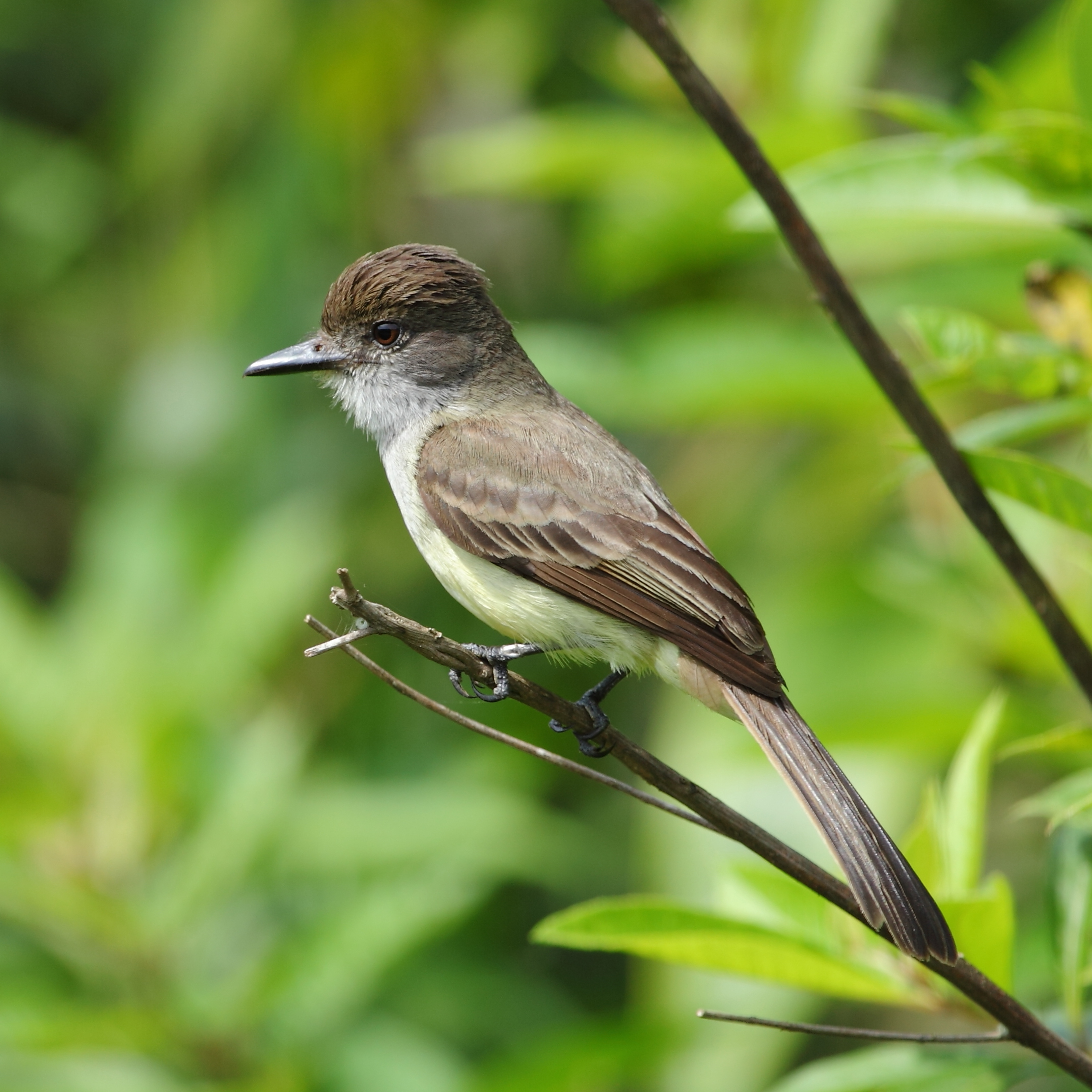
Short-crested flycatcher

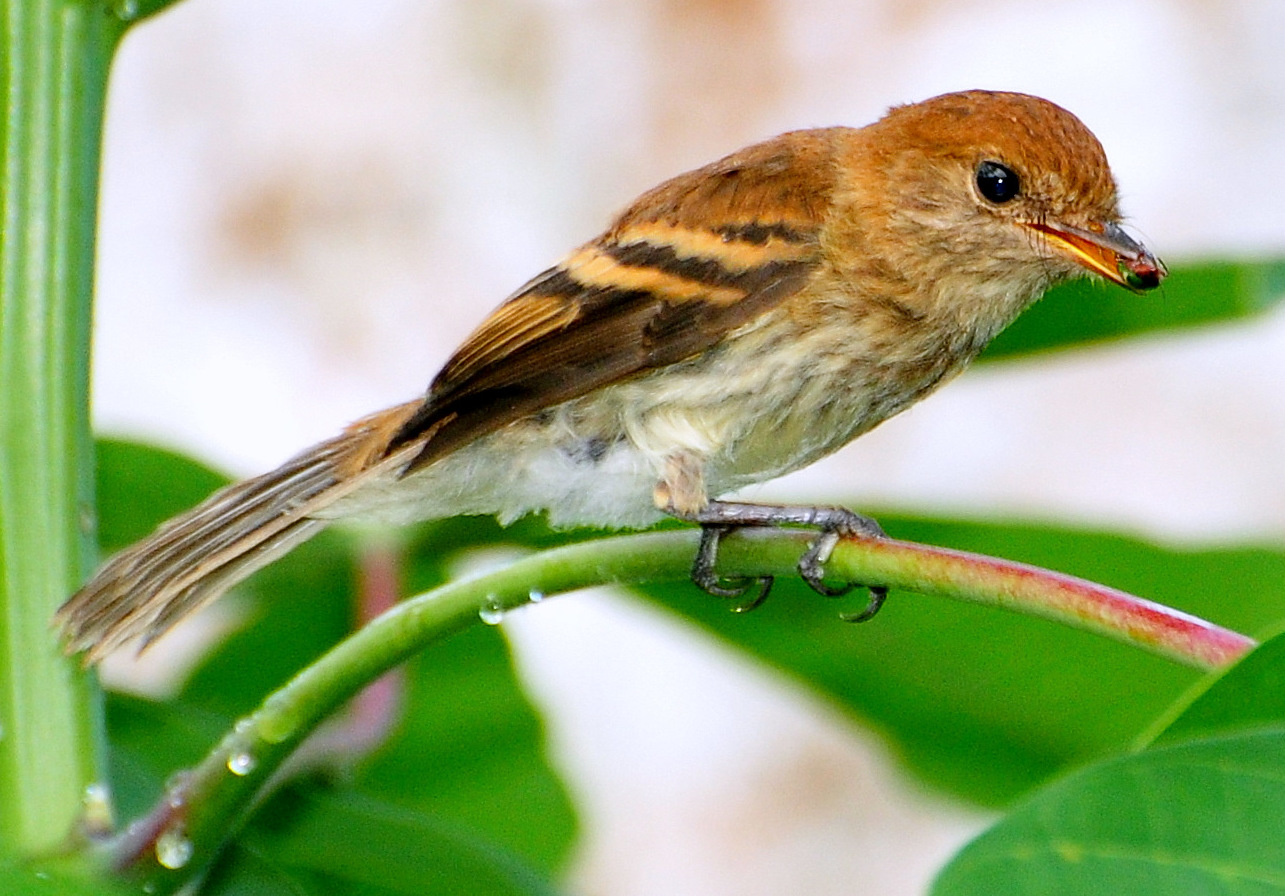
Bran-colored flycatcher

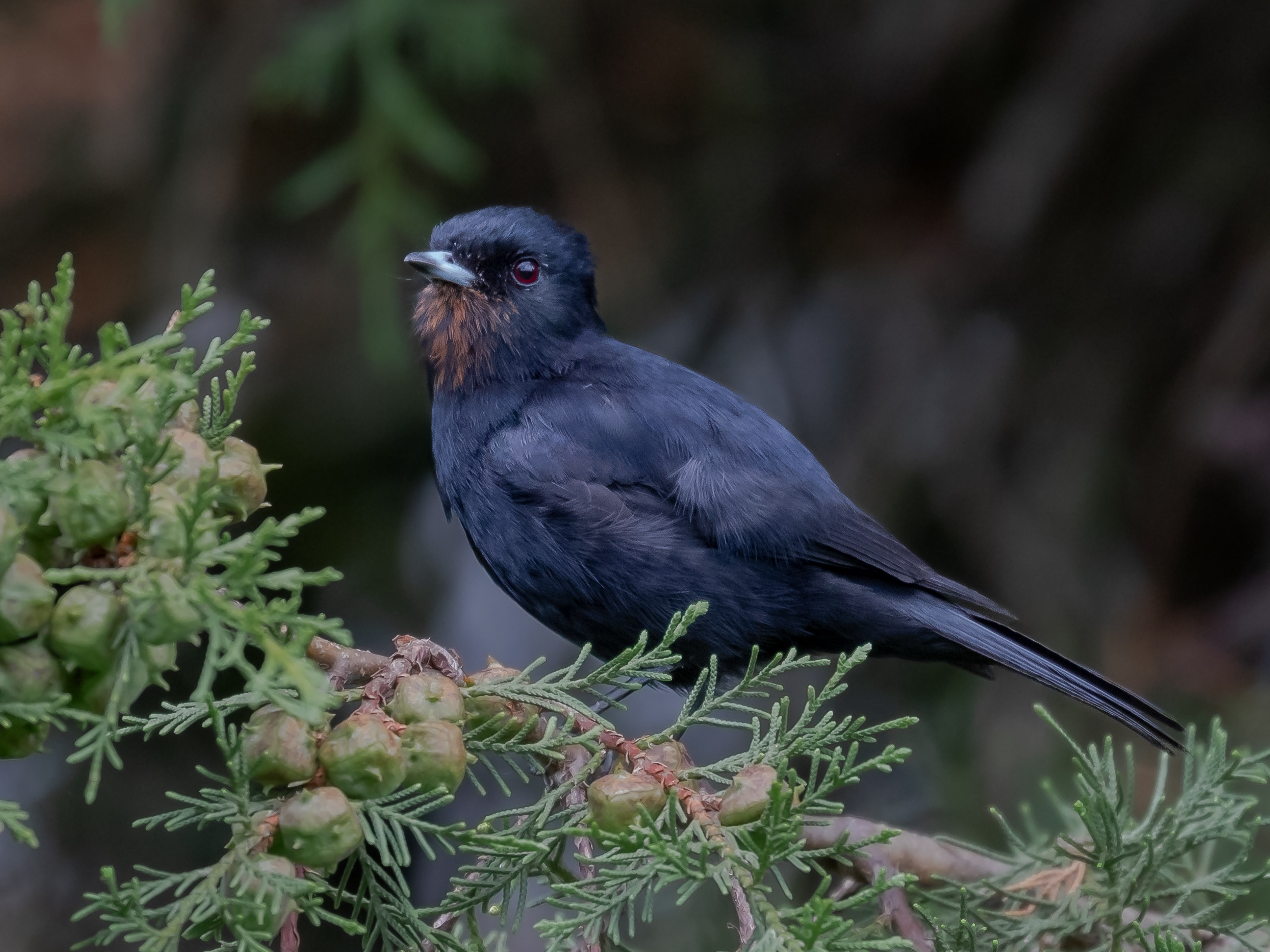
Velvety black tyrant

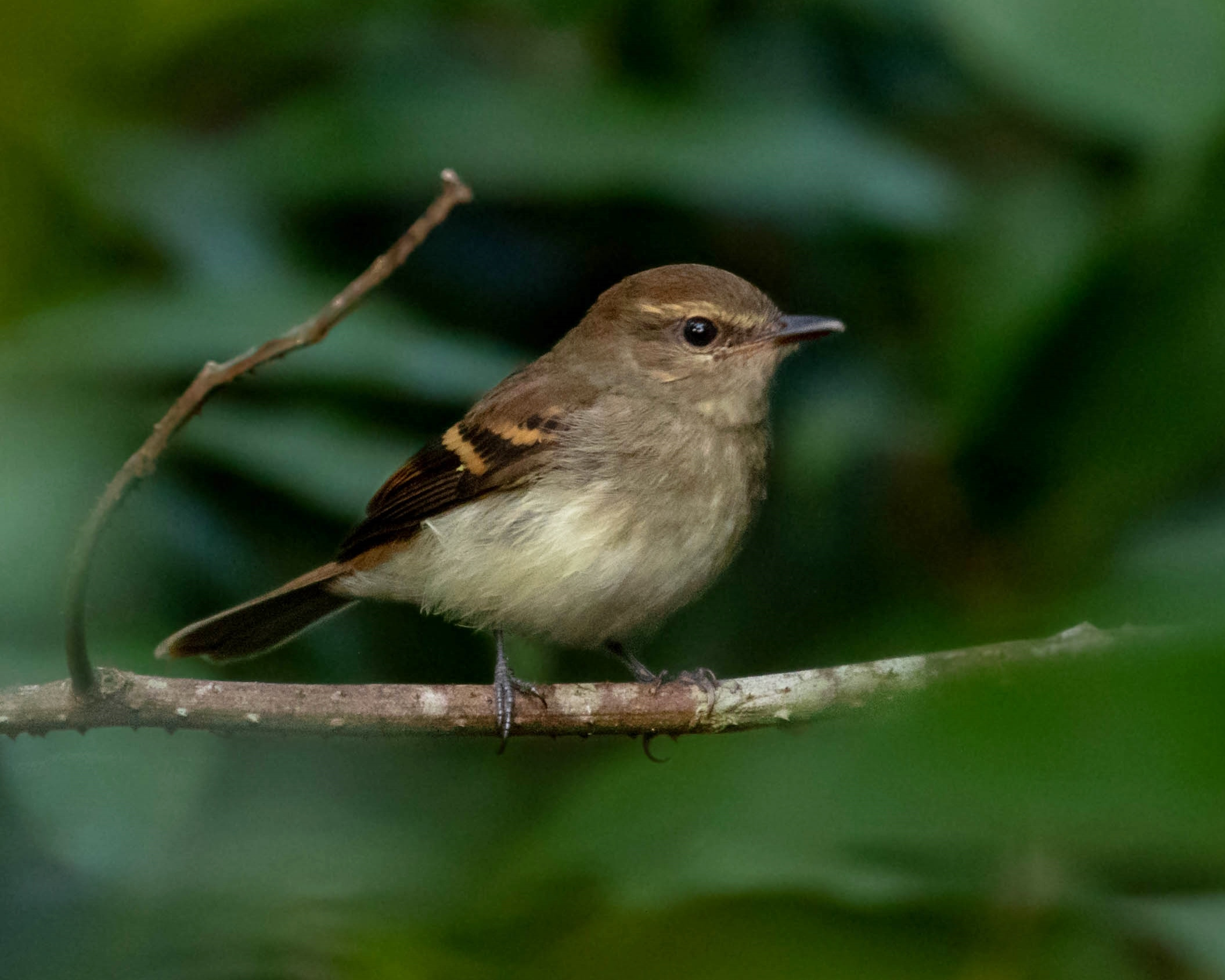
Fuscous flycatcher

Order: Passeriformes Family: Tyrannidae

- White-throated spadebill (Platyrinchus mystaceus)
- Wing-barred piprites (Piprites chloris)
- Southern antpipit (Corythopis delalandi)
- Bahia tyrannulet (Phylloscartes beckeri) (EB)
- Alagoas tyrannulet (Phylloscartes ceciliae) (EB)
- Ochre-bellied flycatcher (Mionectes oleagineus)
- Sepia-capped flycatcher (Leptopogon amaurocephalus)
- Olivaceous flatbill (Rhynchocyclus olivaceus)
- Yellow-olive flycatcher (Tolmomyias sulphurescens)
- Grey-crowned flycatcher (Tolmomyias poliocephalus)
- Yellow-breasted flycatcher (Tolmomyias flaviventris)
- Drab-breasted bamboo tyrant (Hemitriccus diops)
- White-eyed tody-tyrant (Hemitriccus zosterops)
- White-bellied tody-tyrant (Hemitriccus griseipectus)
- Pearly-vented tody-tyrant (Hemitriccus margaritaceiventer)
- Buff-breasted tody-tyrant (Hemitriccus mirandae) (EB)
- Ochre-faced tody flycatcher (Poecilotriccus plumbeiceps)
- Smoky-fronted tody flycatcher (Poecilotriccus fumifrons)
- Common tody flycatcher (Todirostrum cinereum)
- Cliff flycatcher (Hirundinea ferruginea)
- Guianan tyrannulet (Zimmerius acer)
- Slender-footed tyrannulet (Zimmerius gracilipes)
- Lesser wagtail tyrant (Stigmatura napensis)
- Greater wagtail tyrant (Stigmatura budytoides)
- Tawny-crowned pygmy-tyrant (Euscarthmus meloryphus)
- White-lored tyrannulet (Ornithion inerme)
- Southern beardless tyrannulet (Camptostoma obsoletum)
- Plain-crested elaenia (Elaenia cristata)
- Yellow-bellied elaenia (Elaenia flavogaster)
- Large elaenia (Elaenia spectabilis)
- Lesser elaenia (Elaenia chiriquensis)
- Olivaceous elaenia (Elaenia mesoleuca)
- White-crested elaenia (Elaenia albiceps)
- Grey elaenia (Myiopagis caniceps)
- Forest elaenia (Myiopagis gaimardii)
- Greenish elaenia (Myiopagis viridicata)
- Suiriri flycatcher (Suiriri suiriri)
- Yellow tyrannulet (Capsiempis flaveola)
- Planalto tyrannulet (Phyllomyias fasciatus)
- Mouse-colored tyrannulet (Phaeomyias murina)
- Crested doradito (Pseudocolopteryx sclateri) (A)
- White-crested tyrannulet (Serpophaga subcristata)
- Bright-rumped attila (Attila spadiceus)
- Piratic flycatcher (Legatus leucophaius)
- Great kiskadee (Pitangus sulphuratus)
- Lesser kiskadee (Pitangus lictor)
- Cattle tyrant (Machetornis rixosa)
- Boat-billed flycatcher (Megarynchus pitangua)
- Streaked flycatcher (Myiodynastes maculatus)
- Rusty-margined flycatcher (Myiozetetes cayanensis)
- Social flycatcher (Myiozetetes similis)
- Variegated flycatcher (Empidonomus varius)
- Tropical kingbird (Tyrannus melancholicus)
- Fork-tailed flycatcher (Tyrannus savana) (A)
- Greyish mourner (Rhytipterna simplex)
- Ash-throated casiornis (Casiornis fuscus) (EB)
- Swainson's flycatcher (Myiarchus swainsoni)
- Dusky-capped flycatcher (Myiarchus tuberculifer)
- Short-crested flycatcher (Myiarchus ferox)
- Brown-crested flycatcher (Myiarchus tyrannulus)
- Bran-colored flycatcher (Myiophobus fasciatus)
- Southern scrub flycatcher (Sublegatus modestus)
- Vermilion flycatcher (Pyrocephalus rubinus)
- Black-backed water tyrant (Fluvicola albiventer)
- Masked water tyrant (Fluvicola nengeta)
- White-headed marsh tyrant (Arundinicola leucocephala)
- Velvety black tyrant (Knipolegus nigerrimus) (EB)
- Yellow-browed tyrant (Satrapa icterophrys) (A)
- White monjita (Xolmis irupero)
- Fuscous flycatcher (Cnemotriccus fuscatus)
- Euler's flycatcher (Lathrotriccus euleri)
- Tropical pewee (Contopus cinereus)

== Antbirds ==
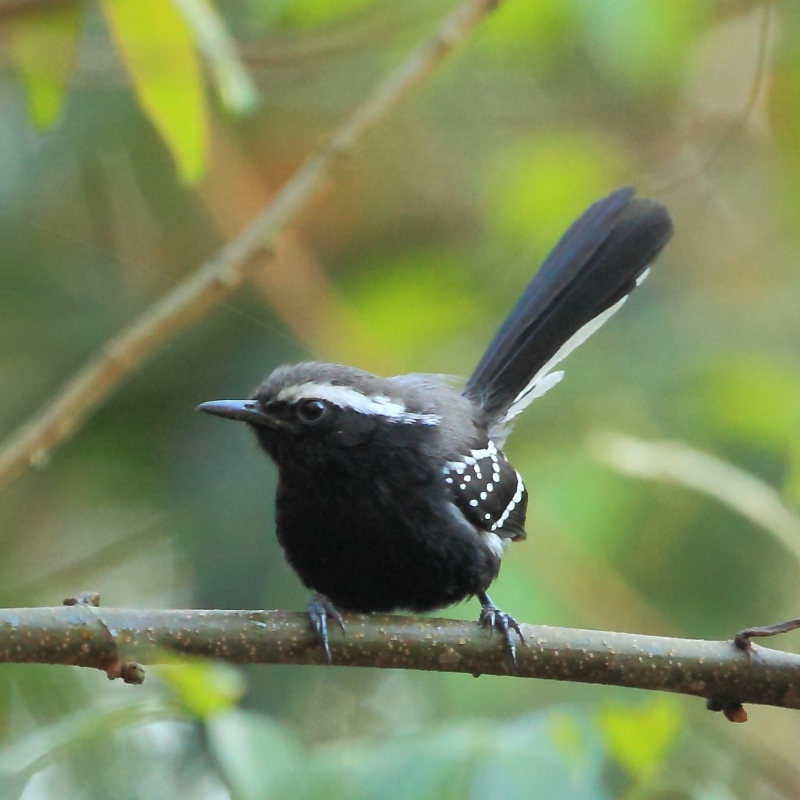
Black-bellied antwren

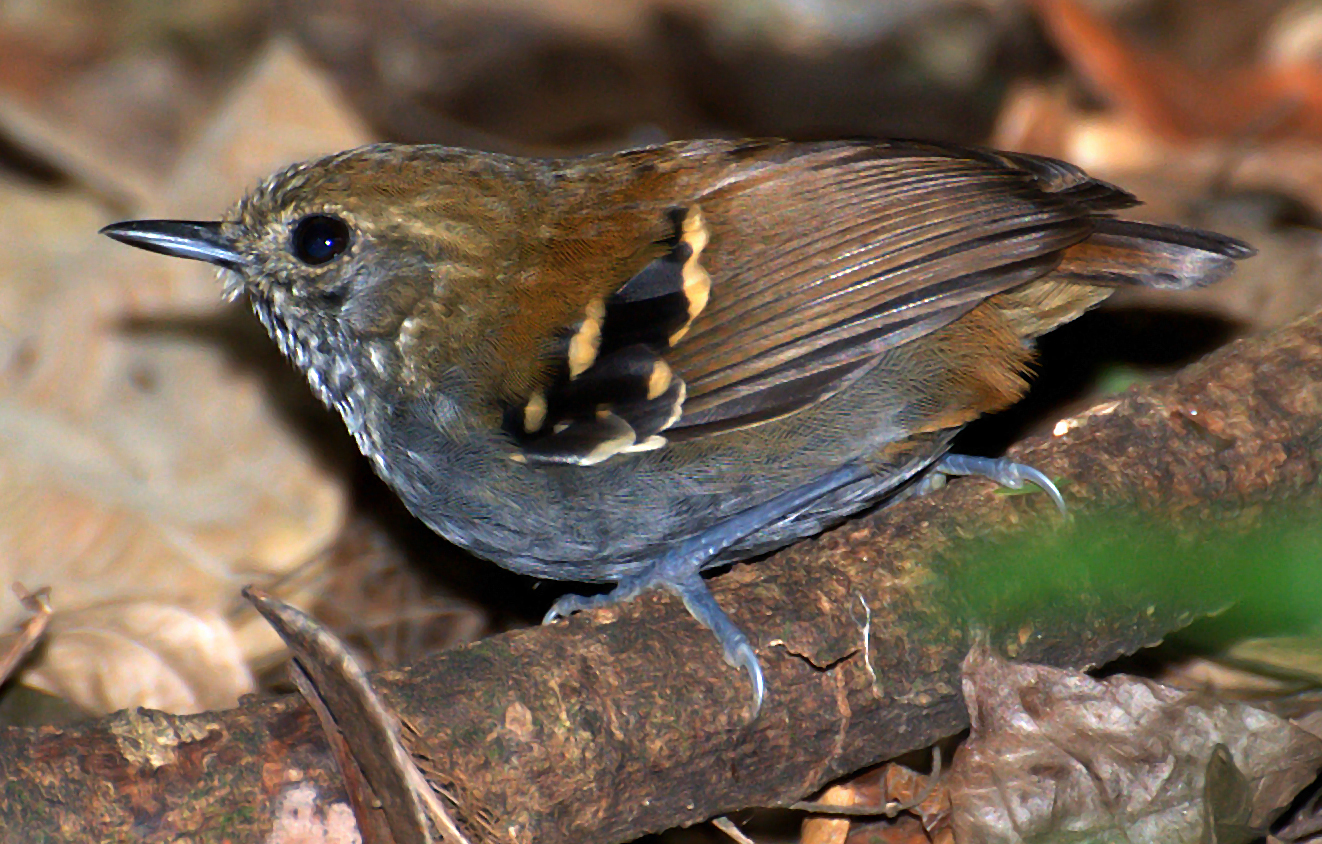
Star-throated antwren

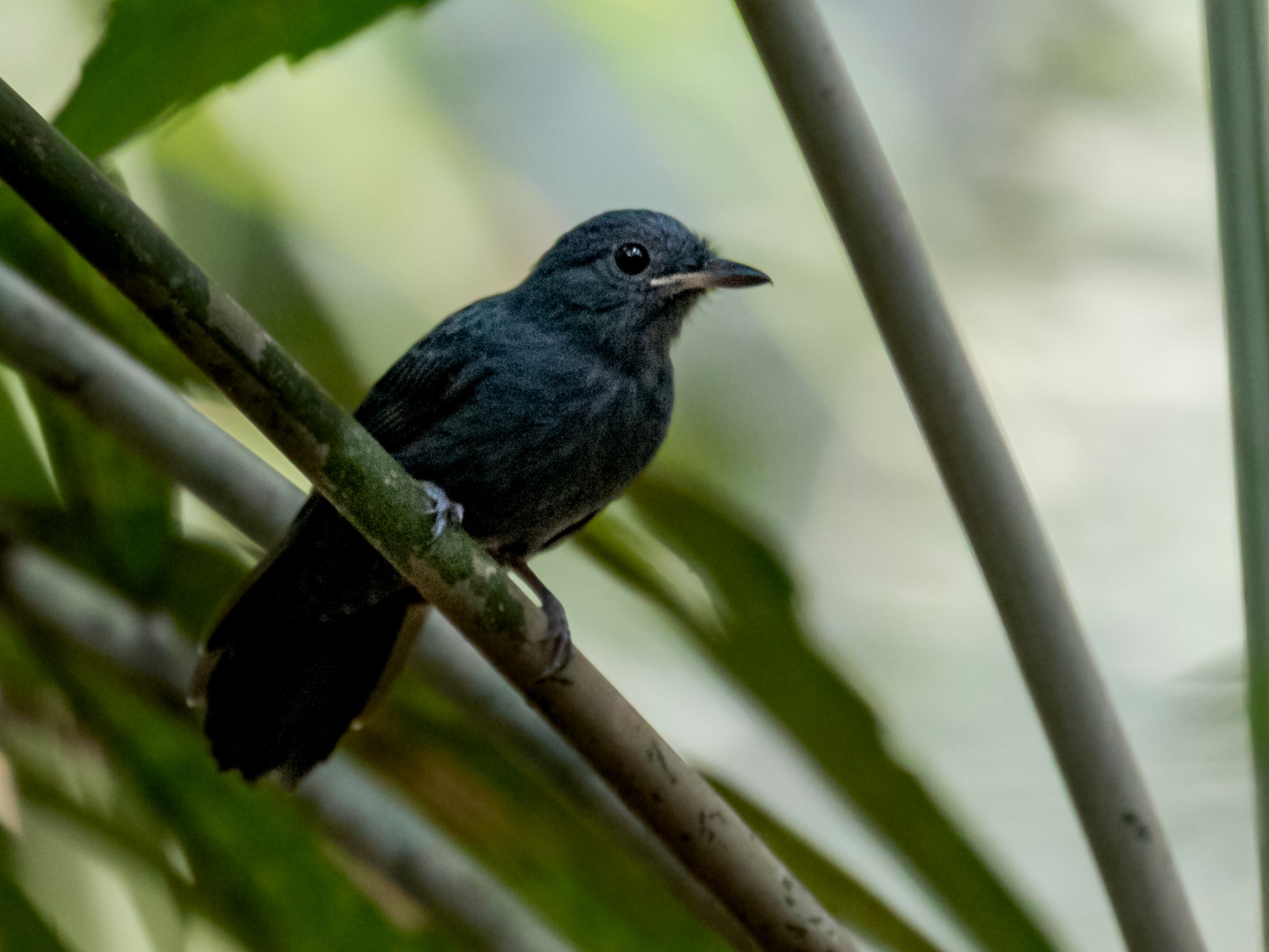
Cinereous antshrike

Order: Passeriformes Family: Thamnophilidae

- Stripe-backed antbird (Myrmorchilus strigilatus)
- Dot-winged antwren (Microrhopias quixensis)
- White-fringed antwren (Formicivora grisea)
- Black-bellied antwren (Formicivora melanogaster)
- Rusty-backed antwren (Formicivora rufa)
- White-flanked antwren (Myrmotherula axillaris)
- Unicolored antwren (Myrmotherula unicolor) (EB)
- Alagoas antwren (Myrmotherula snowi) (ES)
- Orange-bellied antwren (Terenura sicki) (EB)
- Star-throated antwren (Rhopias gularis)
- Cinereous antshrike (Thamnomanes caesius)
- Plain antvireo (Dysithamnus mentalis)
- Plumbeous antvireo (Dysithamnus plumbeus)
- Caatinga antwren (Herpsilochmus sellowi) (EB)
- Bahia antwren (Herpsilochmus pileatus) (EB)
- Black-capped antwren (Herpsilochmus atricapillus)
- Pectoral antwren (Herpsilochmus pectoralis) (EB)
- Rufous-winged antwren (Herpsilochmus rufimarginatus)
- Great antshrike (Taraba major)
- Spot-backed antshrike (Hypoedaleus guttatus)
- Silvery-cheeked antshrike (Sakesphorus cristatus) (A)
- Rufous-winged antshrike (Thamnophilus torquatus)
- Chestnut-backed antshrike (Thamnophilus palliatus)
- Planalto slaty antshrike (Thamnophilus pelzelni) (EB)
- Sooretama slaty antshrike (Thamnophilus ambiguus) (EB)
- Variable antshrike (Thamnophilus caerulescens)
- White-shouldered antshrike (Thamnophilus aethiops)
- Willis's antbird (Cercomacra laeta) (EB)
- Scaled antbird (Drymophila squamata) (EB)
- Scalloped antbird (Myrmoderus ruficauda) (EB)
- White-backed fire-eye (Pyriglena leuconota)

== Gnateaters ==
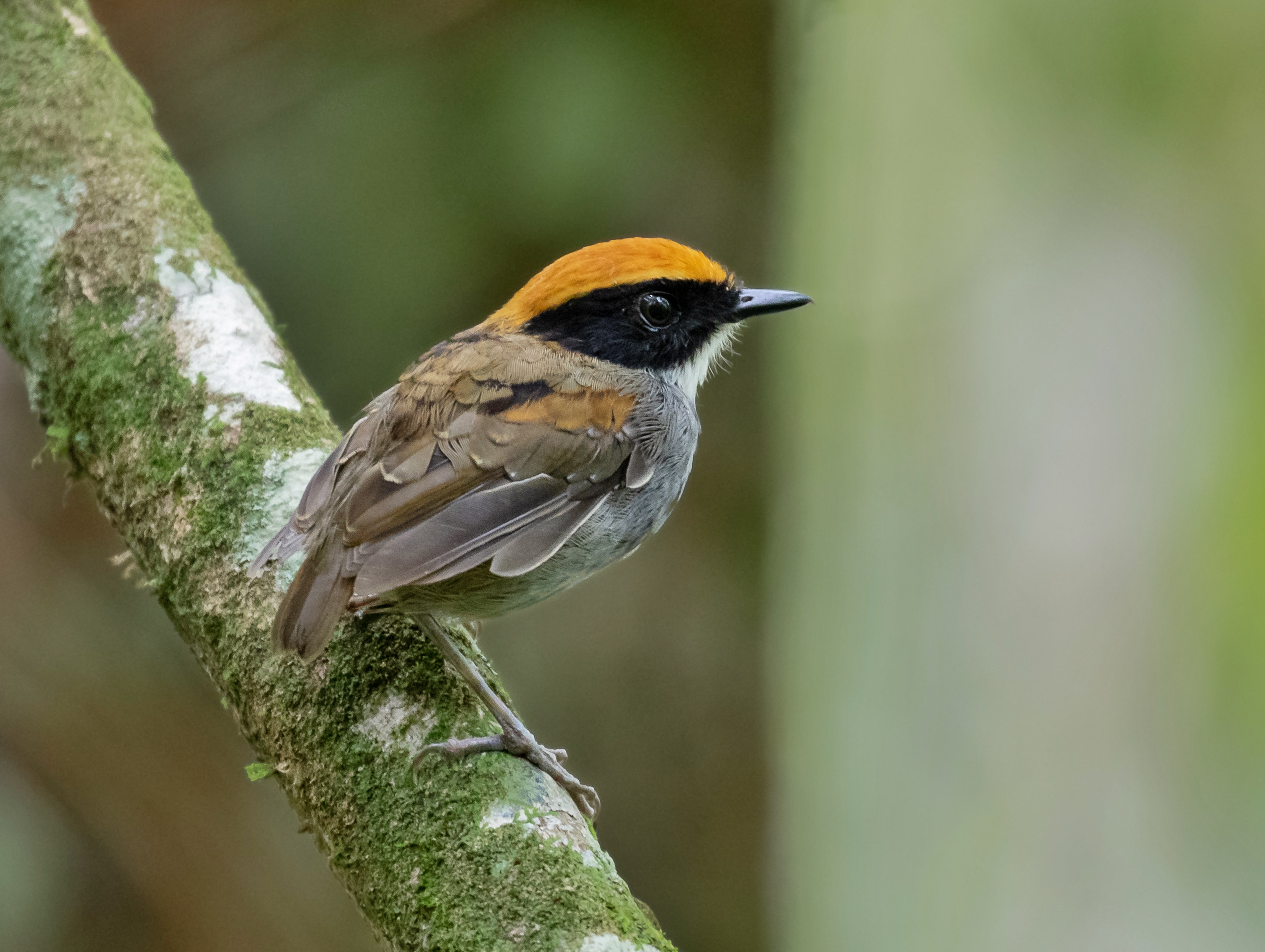
Black-cheeked gnateater

Order: Passeriformes Family: Conopophagidae

- Black-cheeked gnateater (Conopophaga melanops) (EB)
- Ceará gnateater (Conopophaga cearae) (EB)

== Antpittas ==
Order: Passeriformes Family: Grallariidae

- White-browed antpitta (Hylopezus ochroleucus) (EB)

== Antthrushes ==
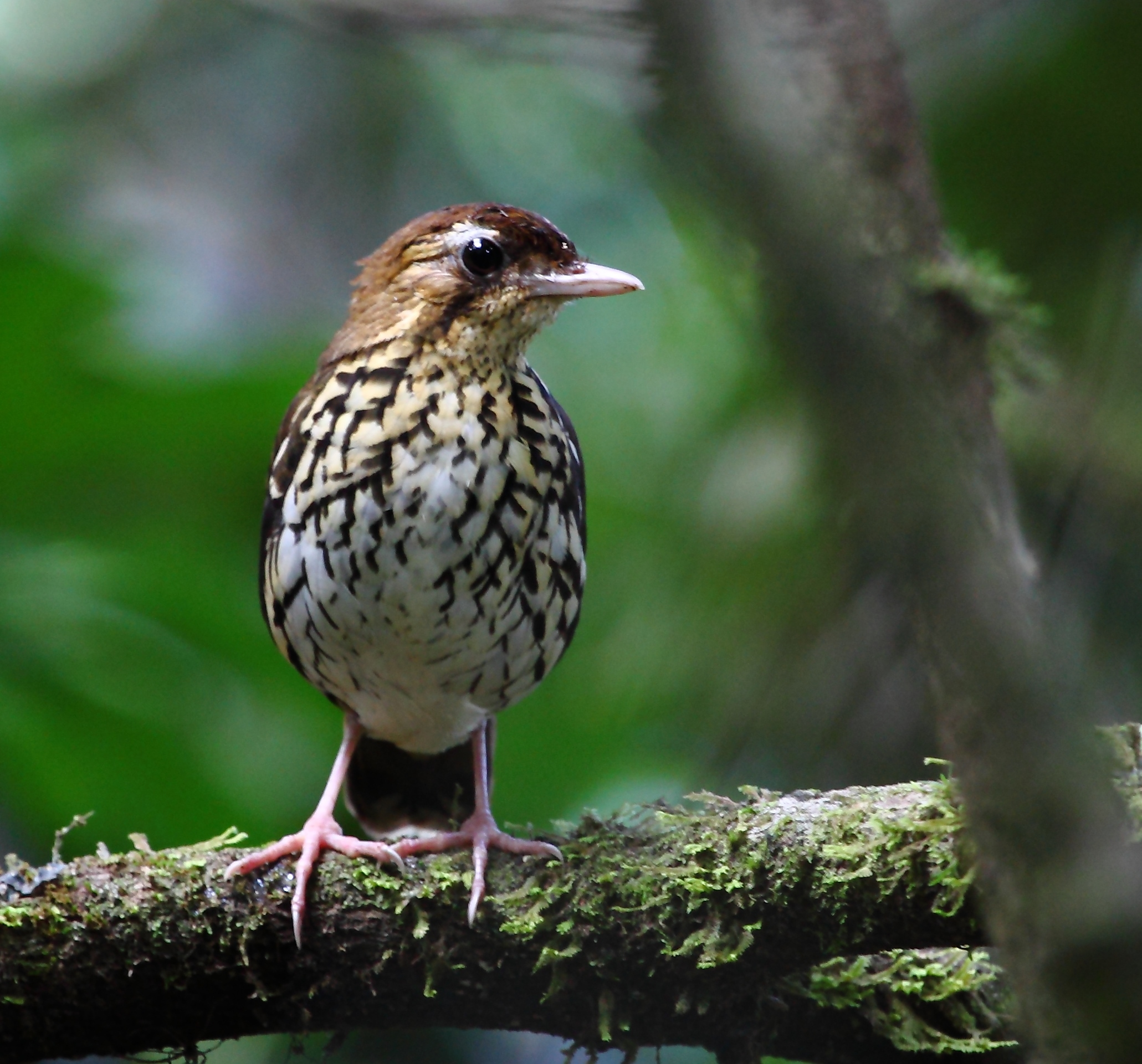
Short-tailed antthrush

Order: Passeriformes Family: Formicariidae

- Rufous-capped antthrush (Formicarius colma)
- Short-tailed antthrush (Chamaeza campanisona)

== Leaftossers ==
Order: Passeriformes Family: Scleruridae

- Black-tailed leaftosser (Sclerurus caudacutus)

== Woodcreepers ==
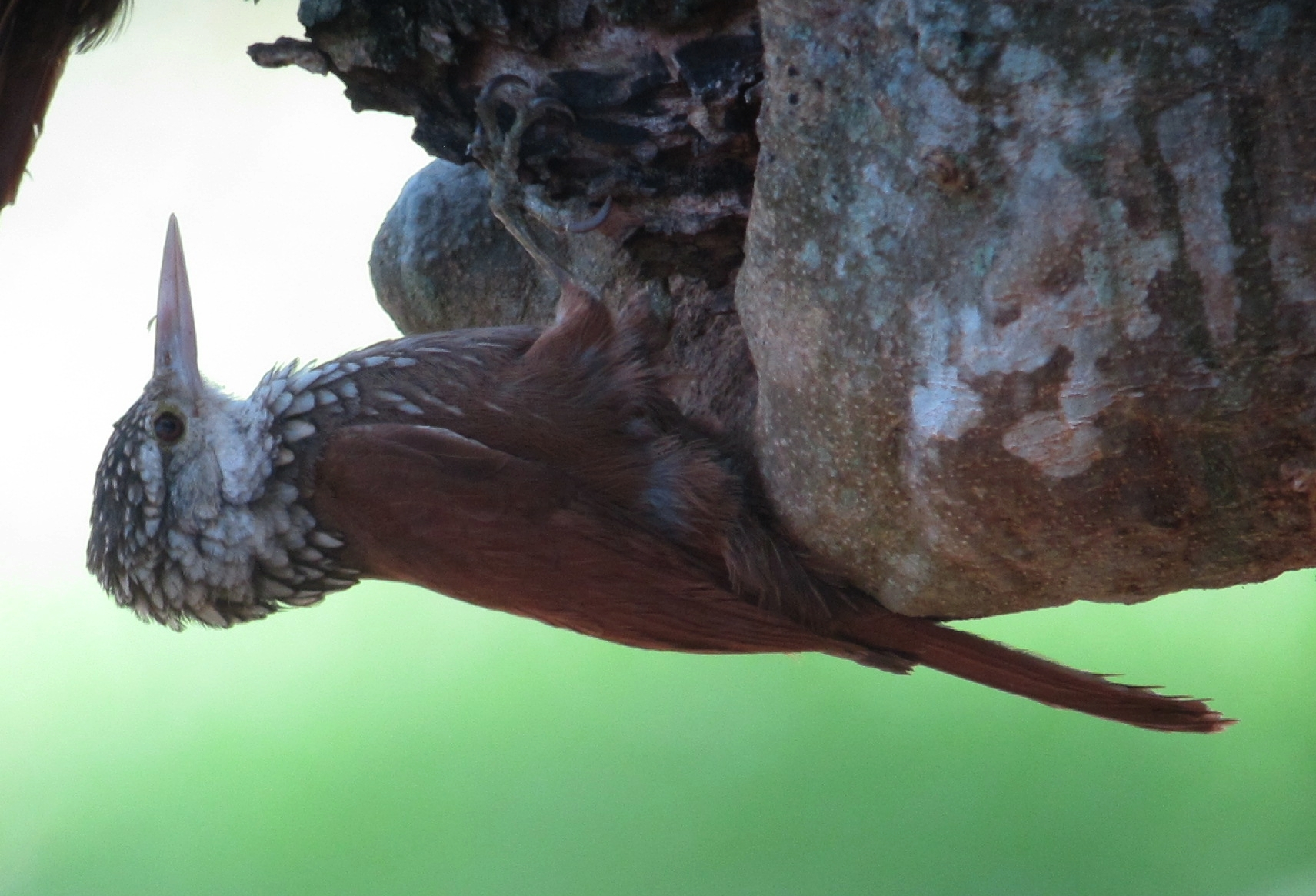
Straight-billed woodcreeper

Order: Passeriformes Family: Dendrocolaptidae

- Olivaceous woodcreeper (Sittasomus griseicapillus)
- Planalto woodcreeper (Dendrocolaptes platyrostris)
- Buff-throated woodcreeper (Xiphorhynchus guttatus)
- Straight-billed woodcreeper (Dendroplex picus)
- Red-billed scythebill (Campylorhamphus trochilirostris)
- Narrow-billed woodcreeper (Lepidocolaptes angustirostris)
- Ceara woodcreeper (Xiphorhynchus atlanticus) (EB)

== Ovenbirds ==
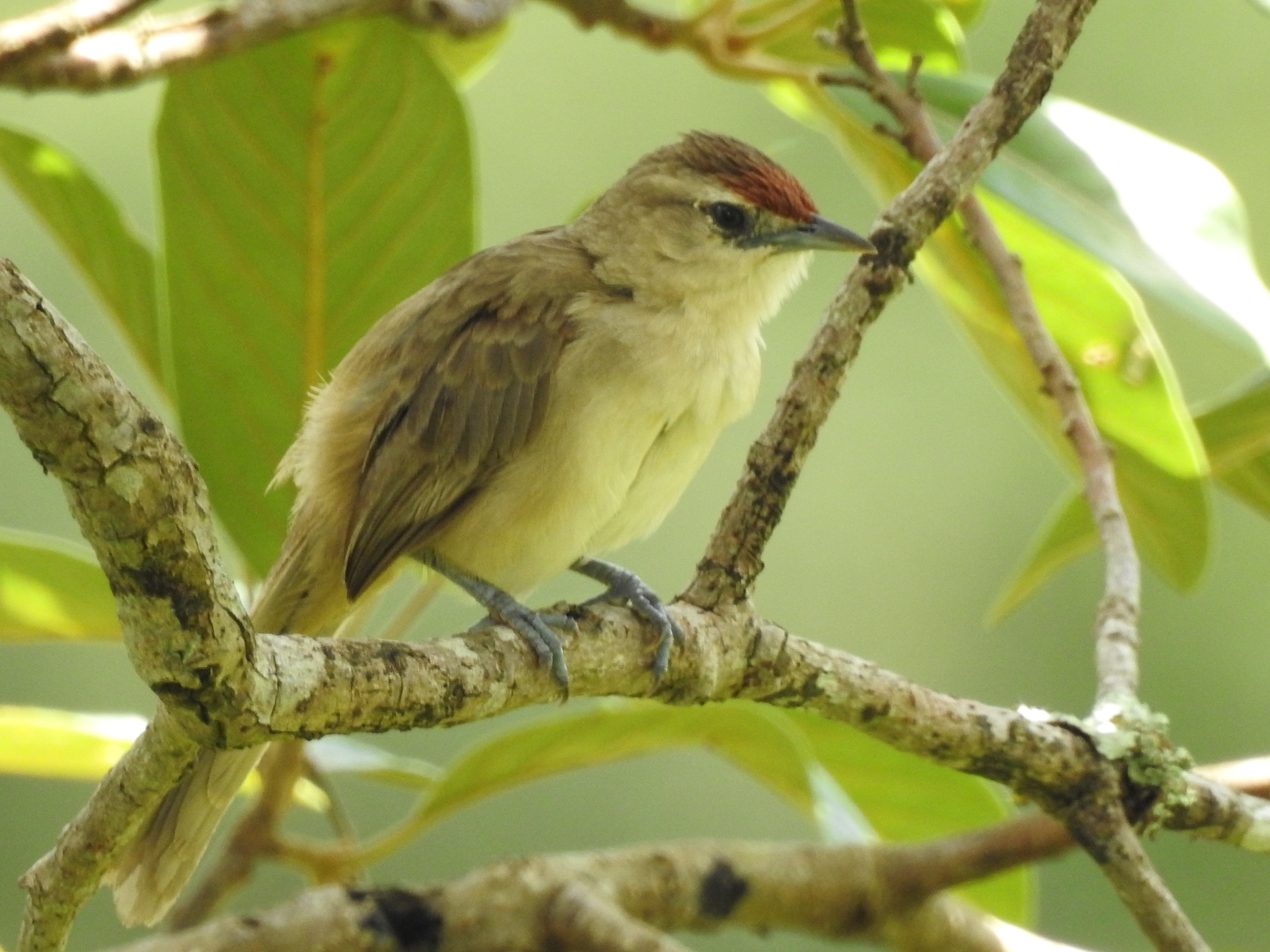
Rufous-fronted thornbird

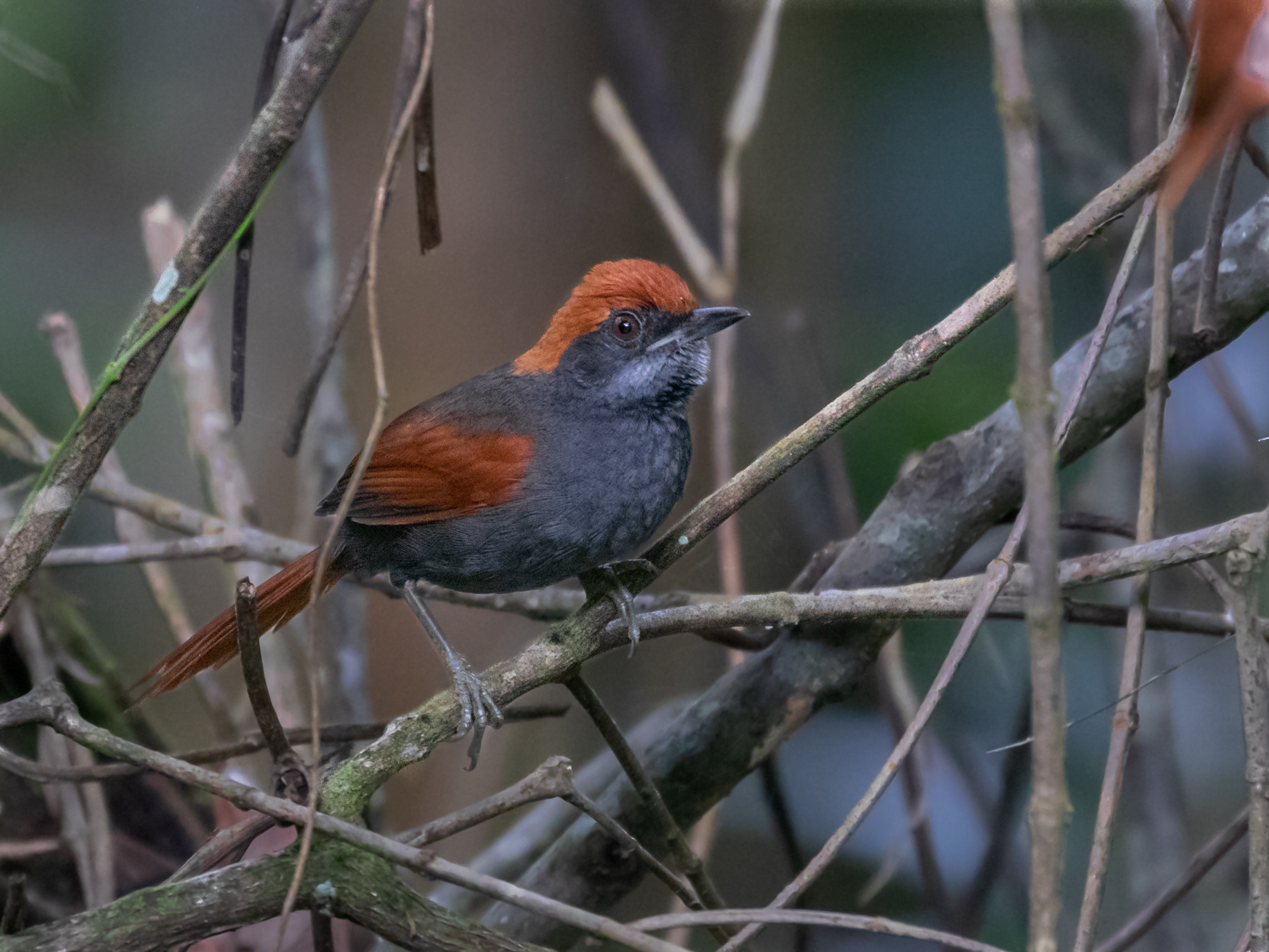
Pinto's spinetail

Order: Passeriformes Family: Furnariidae

- Plain xenops (Xenops minutus)
- Band-tailed hornero (Furnarius figulus) (EB)
- Pale-legged hornero (Furnarius leucopus)
- Rufous hornero (Furnarius rufus)
- Alagoas foliage-gleaner (Philydor novaesi) (E)(ES)
- Pernambuco foliage-gleaner (Automolus lammi) (EB)
- White-eyed foliage-gleaner (Automolus leucophthalmus) (A)
- Rufous-fronted thornbird (Phacellodomus rufifrons)
- Grey-headed spinetail (Cranioleuca semicinerea) (EB)
- Caatinga cacholote (Pseudoseisura cristata) (EB)
- Yellow-chinned spinetail (Certhiaxis cinnamomeus)
- Ochre-cheeked spinetail (Synallaxis scutata)
- Red-shouldered spinetail (Synallaxis hellmayri) (EB)
- Pinto's spinetail (Synallaxis infuscata) (EB)
- Cinereous-breasted spinetail (Synallaxis hypospodia)
- Pale-breasted spinetail (Synallaxis albescens)
- Sooty-fronted spinetail (Synallaxis frontalis)

== Vireos and allies ==
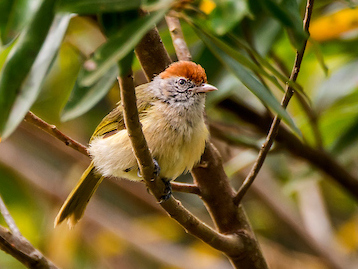
Grey-eyed greenlet

Order: Passeriformes Family: Vireonidae

- Rufous-browed peppershrike (Cyclarhis gujanensis)
- Red-eyed vireo (Vireo olivaceus)
- Rufous-crowned greenlet (Hylophilus poicilotis)
- Grey-eyed greenlet (Hylophilus amaurocephalus) (EB)

== Corvids and jays ==
Order: Passeriformes Family: Corvidae

- White-naped jay (Cyanocorax cyanopogon) (EB)

== Estrildid finches ==
Order: Passeriformes Family: Estrildidae

- Common waxbill (Estrilda astrild) (I)

== Old World sparrows ==
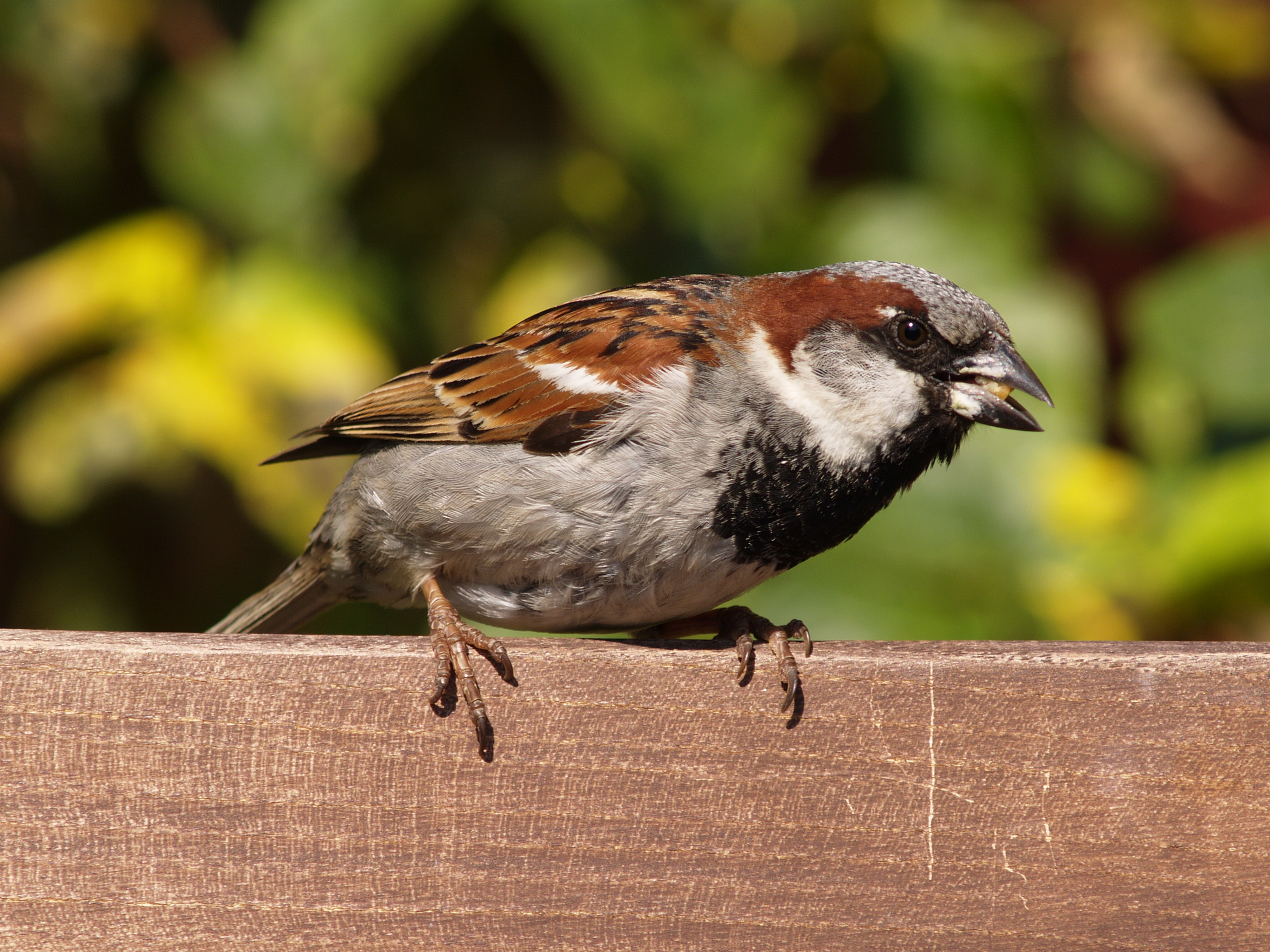
House sparrow

Order: Passeriformes Family: Passeridae

- House sparrow (Passer domesticus) (I)

== Pipits ==
Order: Passeriformes Family: Motacillidae

- Yellowish pipit (Anthus lutescens)

== True finches ==
Order: Passeriformes Family: Fringillidae

- Purple-throated euphonia (Euphonia chlorotica)
- Violaceous euphonia (Euphonia violacea)
- Yellow-faced siskin (Spinus yarrellii) (ES)

== New World sparrow ==
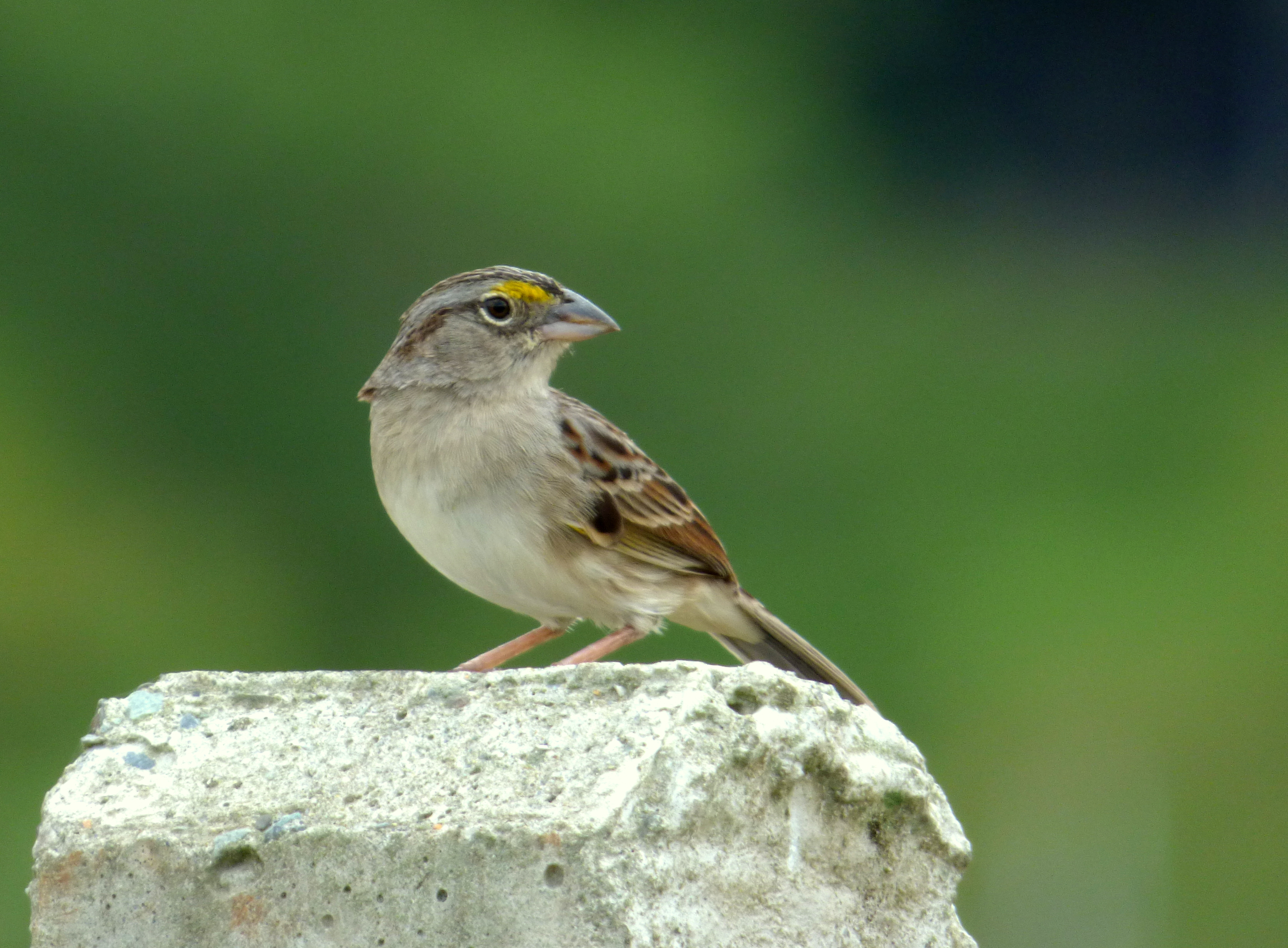
Grassland sparrow

Order: Passeriformes Family: Passerellidae

- Grassland sparrow (Ammodramus humeralis)
- Pectoral sparrow (Arremon taciturnus)
- Rufous-collared sparrow (Zonotrichia capensis)

== New World warblers ==
Order: Passeriformes Family: Parulidae

- Masked yellowthroat (Geothlypis aequinoctialis)
- Tropical parula (Setophaga pitiayumi)
- Flavescent warbler (Myiothlypis flaveola)
- Golden-crowned warbler (Basileuterus culicivorus)

== New World blackbirds ==
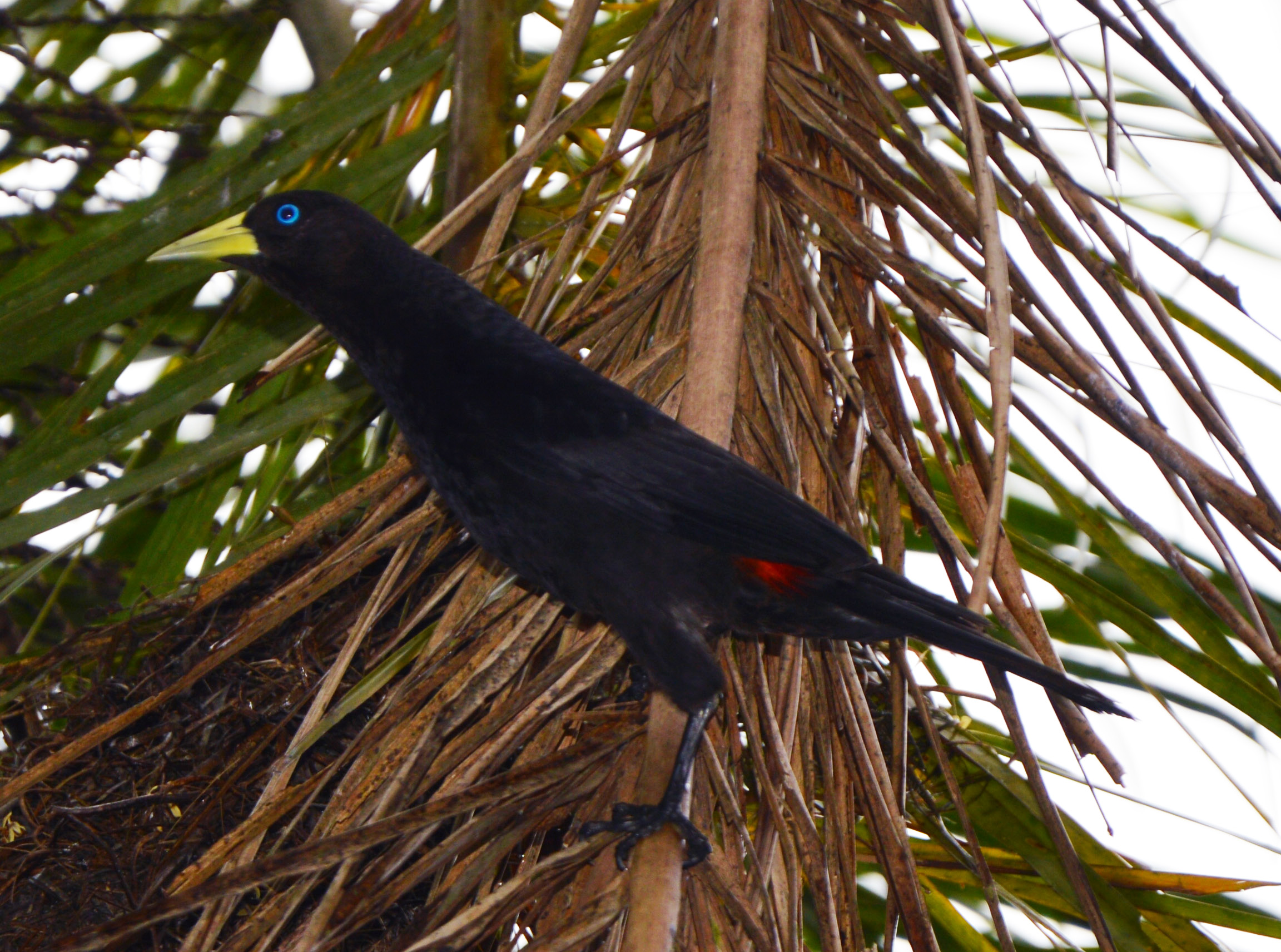
Red-rumped cacique

Order: Passeriformes Family: Icteridae

- White-browed meadowlark (Leistes superciliaris)
- Yellow-rumped cacique (Cacicus cela)
- Red-rumped cacique (Cacicus haemorrhous)
- Campo troupial (Icterus jamacaii) (EB)
- Variable oriole (Icterus pyrrhopterus)
- Screaming cowbird (Molothrus rufoaxillaris)
- Shiny cowbird (Molothrus bonariensis)
- Chopi blackbird (Gnorimopsar chopi)
- Chestnut-capped blackbird (Chrysomus ruficapillus)

== Cardinals ==
Order: Passeriformes Family: Cardinalidae

- Ultramarine grosbeak (Cyanoloxia brissonii)
- Red-crowned ant-tanager (Habia rubica)
- Hepatic tanager (Piranga flava)

== South American tanagers ==
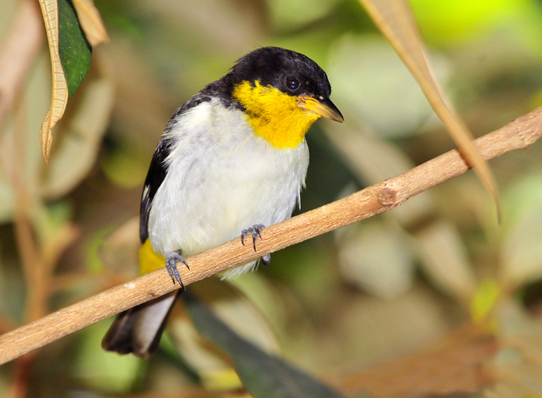
Yellow-backed tanager

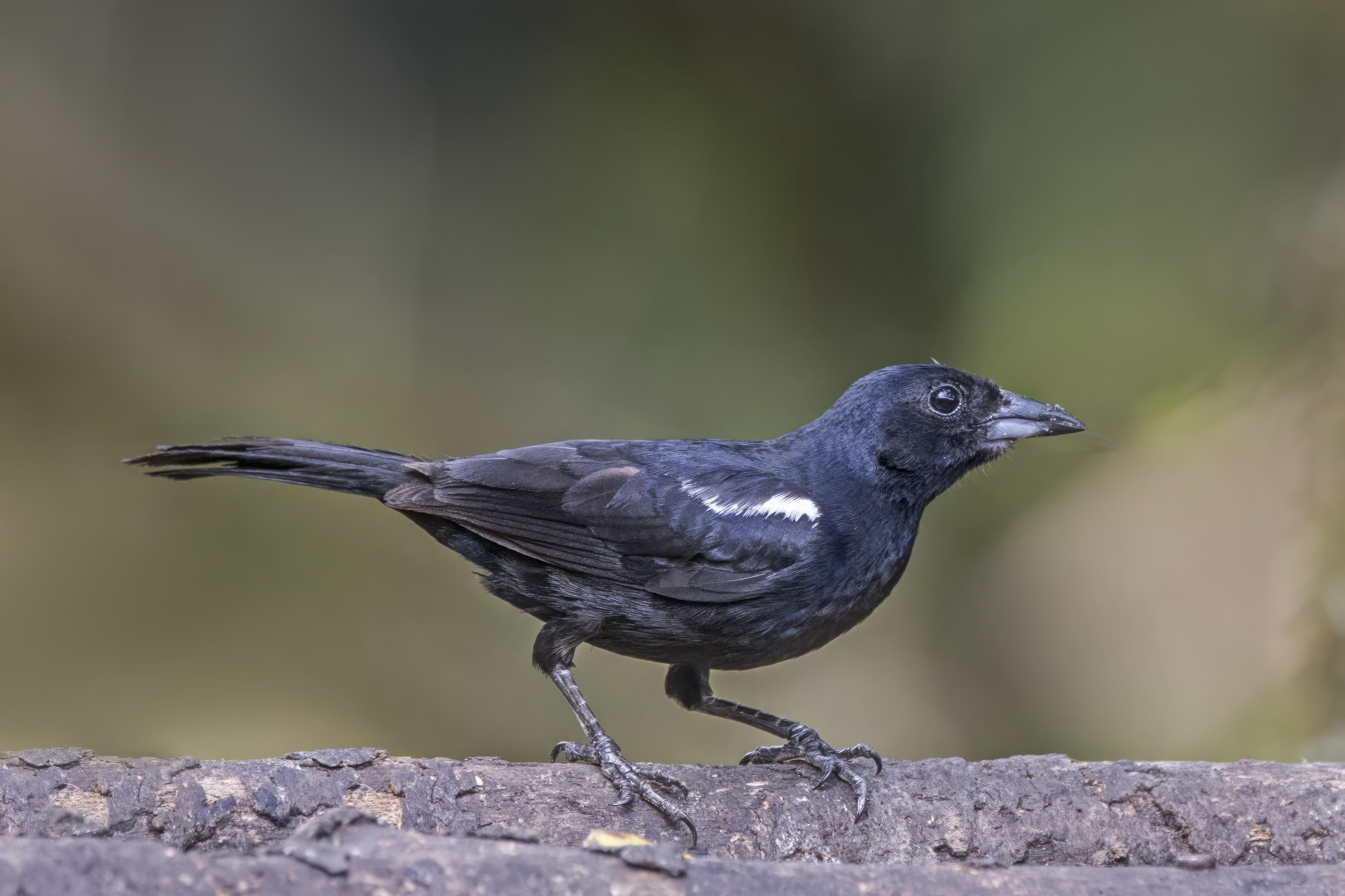
White-lined tanager

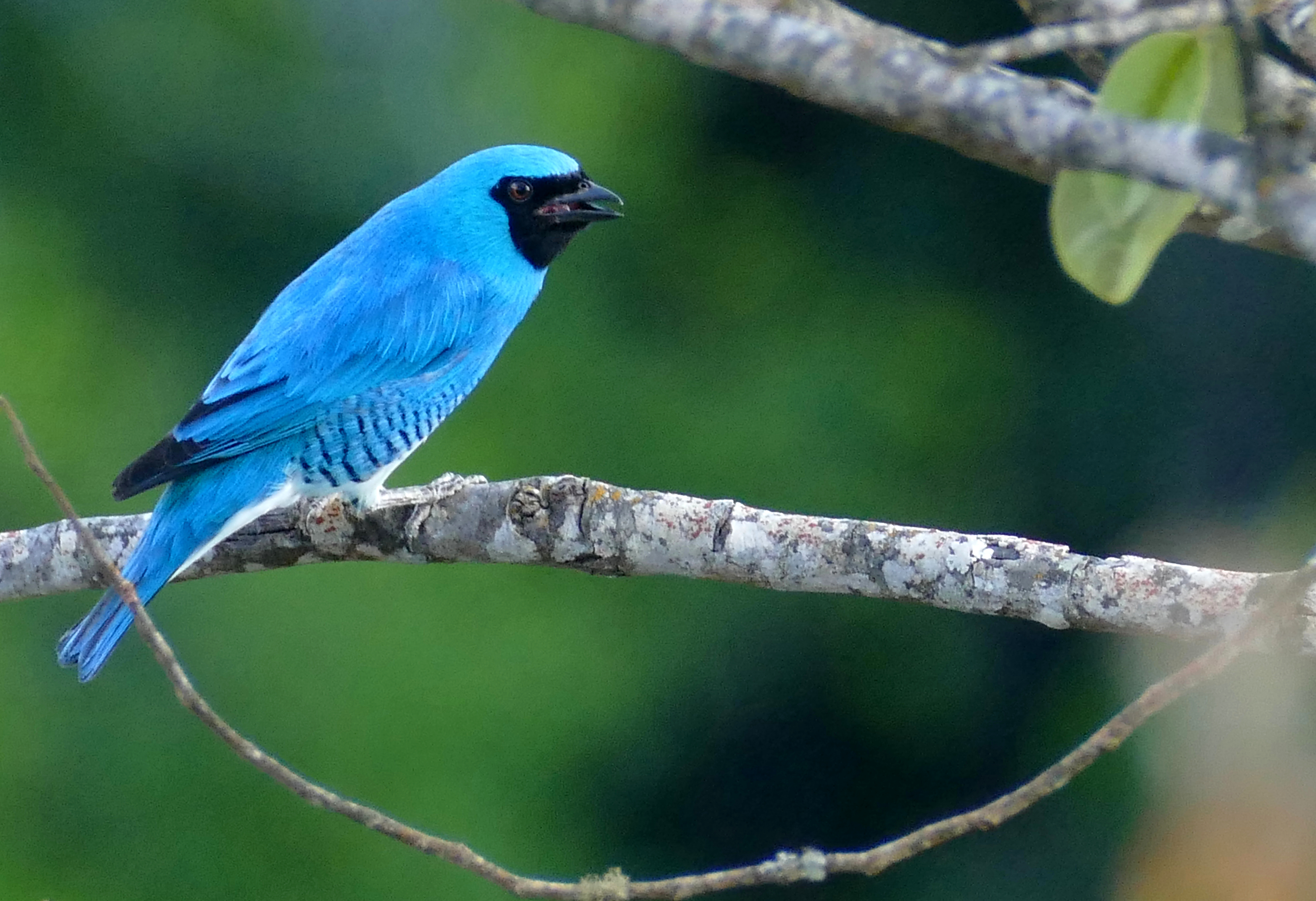
Swallow tanager

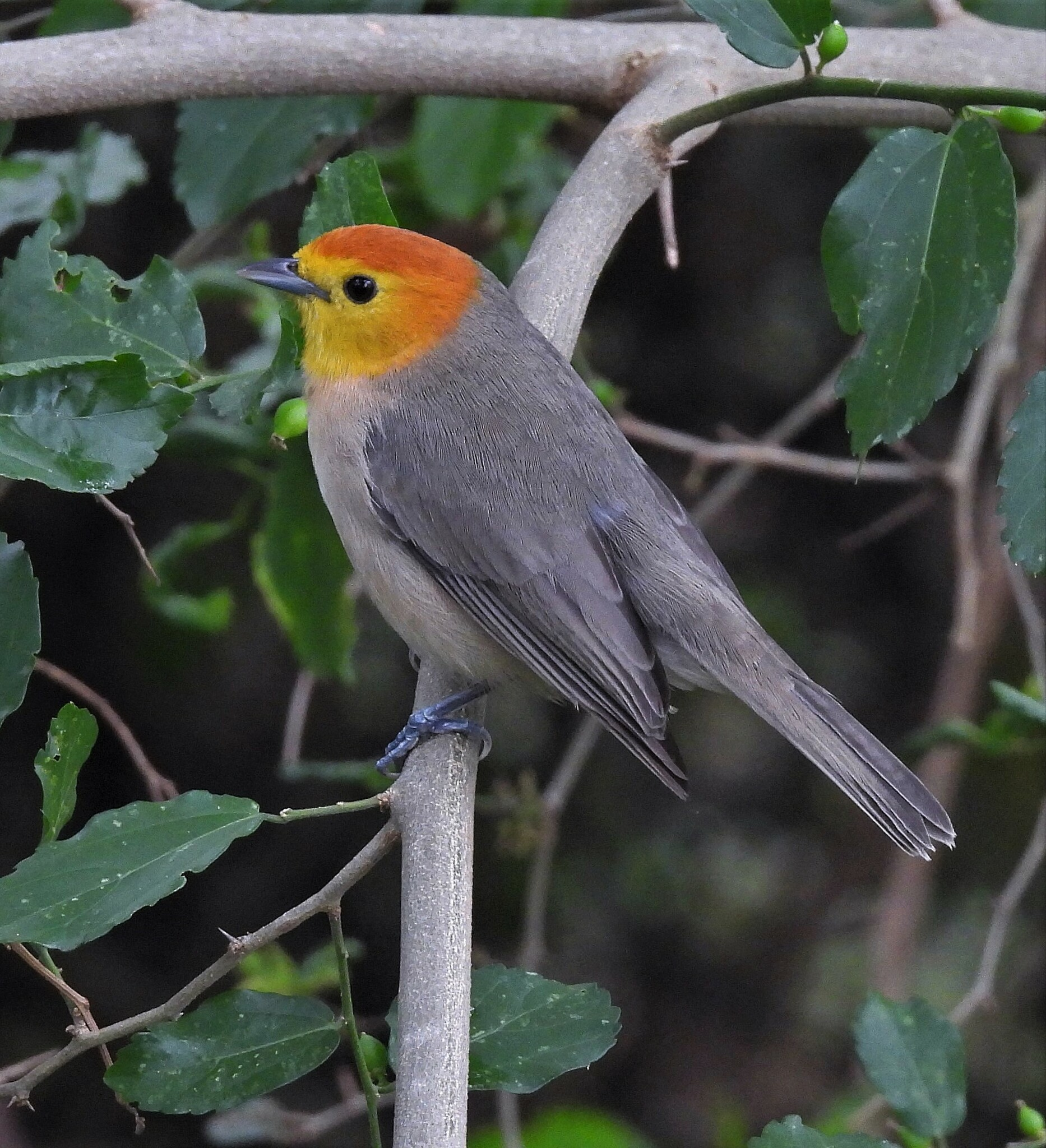
Orange-headed tanager

Order: Passeriformes Family: Thraupidae

- Hooded tanager (Nemosia pileata)
- Scarlet-throated tanager (Compsothraupis loricata) (EB)
- Green honeycreeper (Chlorophanes spiza)
- Guira tanager (Hemithraupis guira)
- Yellow-backed tanager (Hemithraupis flavicollis)
- Chestnut-vented conebill (Conirostrum speciosum)
- Bicolored conebill (Conirostrum bicolor)
- Saffron finch (Sicalis flaveola)
- Orange-fronted yellow finch (Sicalis columbiana)
- Grassland yellow finch (Sicalis luteola)
- Blue-black grassquit (Volatinia jacarina)
- White-lined tanager (Tachyphonus rufus)
- Pileated finch (Coryphospingus pileatus)
- Red-legged honeycreeper (Cyanerpes cyaneus)
- Swallow tanager (Tersina viridis)
- Blue dacnis (Dacnis cayana)
- Lined seedeater (Sporophila lineola)
- White-bellied seedeater (Sporophila leucoptera)
- Copper seedeater (Sporophila bouvreuil)
- Chestnut-bellied seed finch (Sporophila angolensis)
- Yellow-bellied seedeater (Sporophila nigricollis)
- Double-collared seedeater (Sporophila caerulescens)
- White-throated seedeater (Sporophila albogularis) (EB)
- Buff-throated saltator (Saltator maximus)
- Black-throated grosbeak (Saltator fuliginosus)
- Wedge-tailed grass finch (Emberizoides herbicola)
- Orange-headed tanager (Thlypopsis sordida)
- Bananaquit (Coereba flaveola)
- Red-cowled cardinal (Paroaria dominicana) (EB)
- Cinnamon tanager (Schistochlamys ruficapillus) (EB)
- Black-faced tanager (Schistochlamys melanopis)
- Fawn-breasted tanager (Pipraeidea melanonota) (A)
- Red-necked tanager (Tangara cyanocephala) (EB)
- Seven-colored tanager (Tangara fastuosa) (EB)

== Donacobius ==
Order: Passeriformes Family: Donacobiidae

- Black-capped donacobius (Donacobius atricapilla)

== Swallows and martins ==
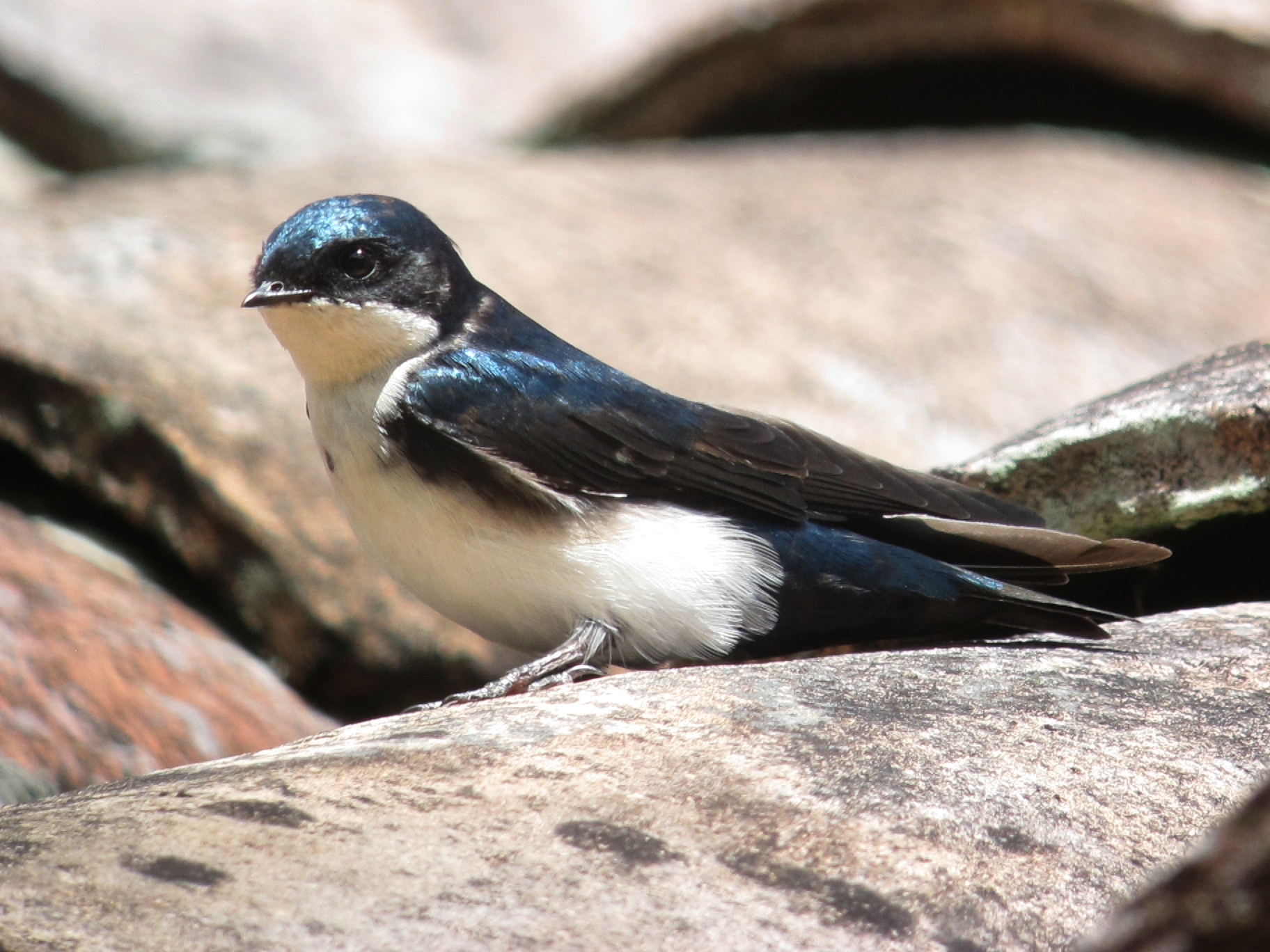
Blue-and-white swallow

Order: Passeriformes Family: Hirundinidae

- Barn swallow (Hirundo rustica)
- White-winged swallow (Tachycineta albiventer)
- White-rumped swallow (Tachycineta leucorrhoa)
- Brown-chested martin (Progne tapera)
- Purple martin (Progne subis)
- Grey-breasted martin (Progne chalybea)
- Southern rough-winged swallow (Stelgidopteryx ruficollis)
- Blue-and-white swallow (Pygochelidon cyanoleuca)

== Wrens ==
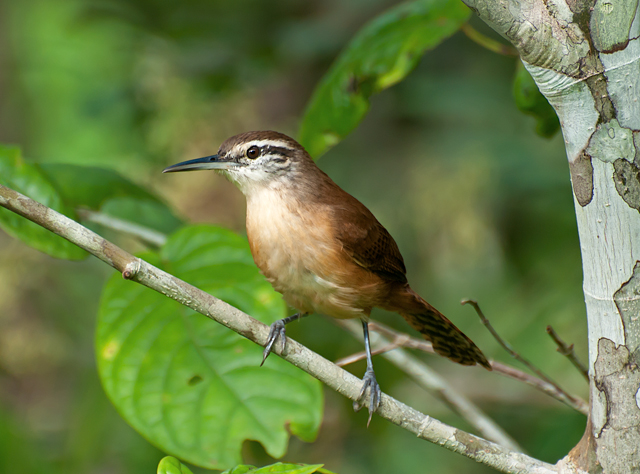
Long-billed wren

Order: Passeriformes Family: Troglodytidae

- House wren (Troglodytes aedon)
- Moustached wren (Pheugopedius genibarbis)
- Long-billed wren (Cantorchilus longirostris) (EB)

== Gnatcatchers ==
Order: Passeriformes Family: Polioptilidae

- Long-billed gnatwren (Ramphocaenus melanurus)

== Mockingbirds ==
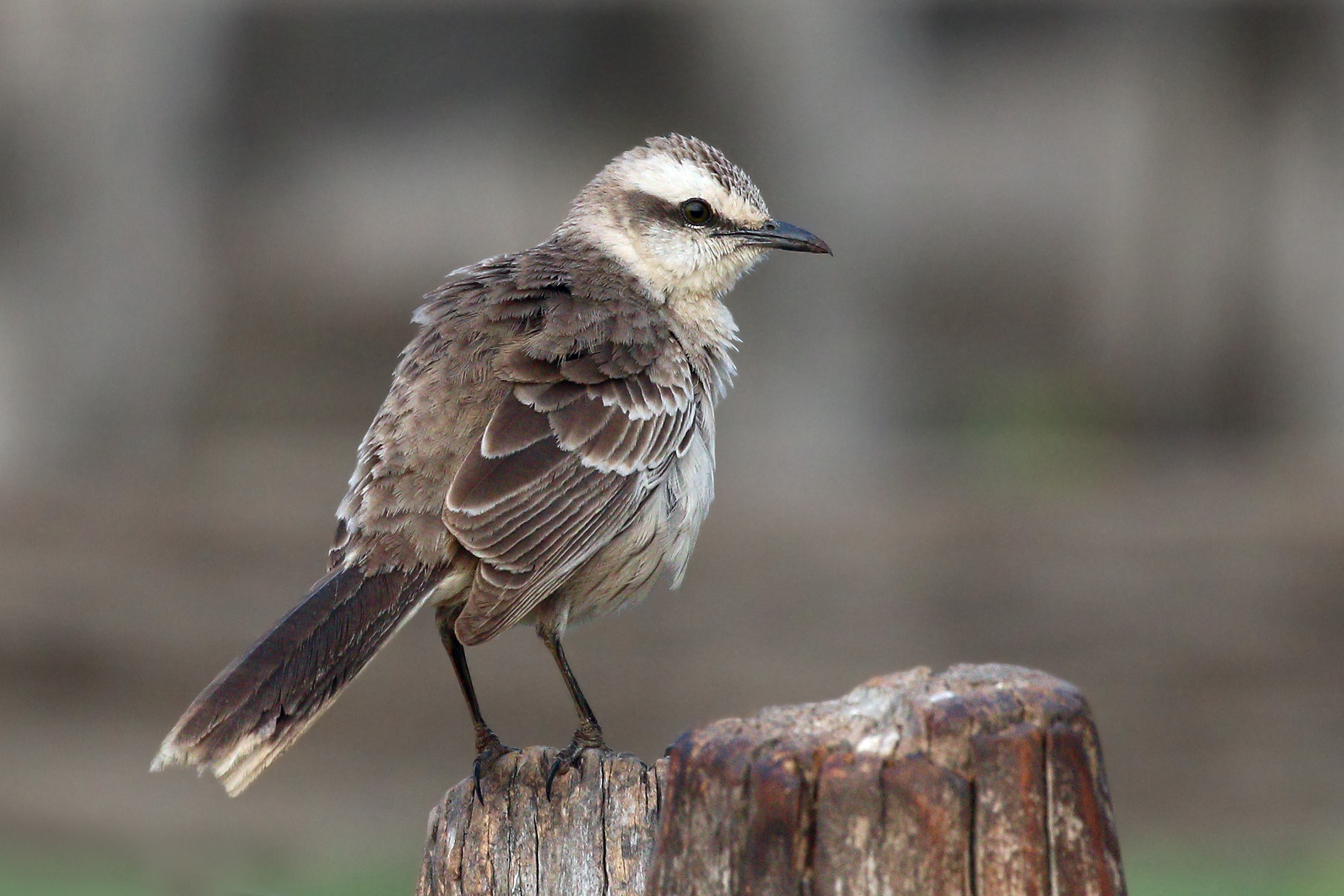
Chalk-browed mockingbird

Order: Passeriformes Family: Mimidae

- Chalk-browed mockingbird (Mimus saturninus)
- Tropical mockingbird (Mimus gilvus)

== Thrushes ==
Order: Passeriformes Family: Turdidae

- Veery (Catharus fuscescens)
- Pale-breasted thrush (Turdus leucomelas)
- Yellow-legged thrush (Turdus flavipes)
- White-necked thrush (Turdus albicollis)
- Rufous-bellied thrush (Turdus rufiventris)
- Creamy-bellied thrush (Turdus amaurochalinus)
