= Fauna of Colombia =

Native animals of Colombia

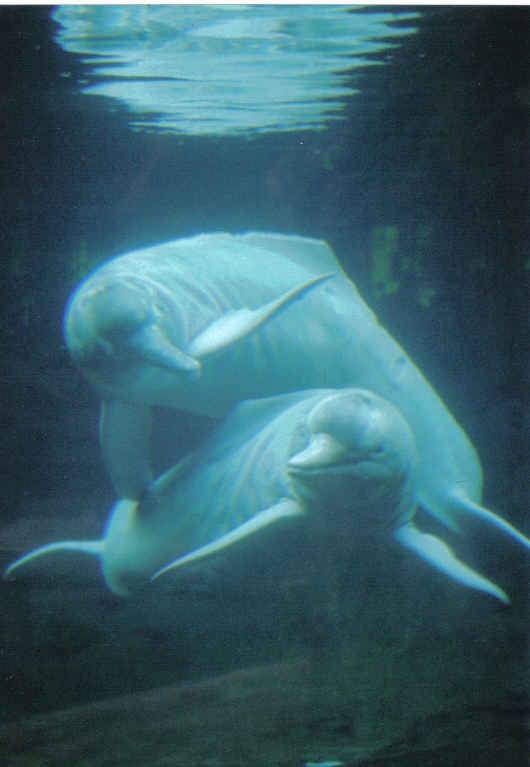
The pink dolphin of the Amazon River is an endangered species.

The fauna of Colombia is characterized by a high biodiversity, with the highest rate of species by area unit worldwide.

== Endemic animals ==
Colombia has the largest number of endemic species (species that are not found naturally anywhere else) worldwide. About 10% of the species in the world live in Colombia. Some determinant factors in the distribution range of the species are the weather conditions, temperature, humidity and sunlight availability.

Endemics can easily become endangered or extinct due to their restricted habitat and vulnerability to the actions of man, including the introduction of new organisms.

=== Ecoregions with high endemism ===
According to the Colombian Ministry of Environment, the following ecoregions have the highest percentage of endemic species:

- Cocora valley (Quindío)
- Serranía de la Macarena (Meta Department)
- Gorgona, Colombia (island in the Pacific Ocean)
- Amacayacu National Park (Amazonas Department)

== Birds ==
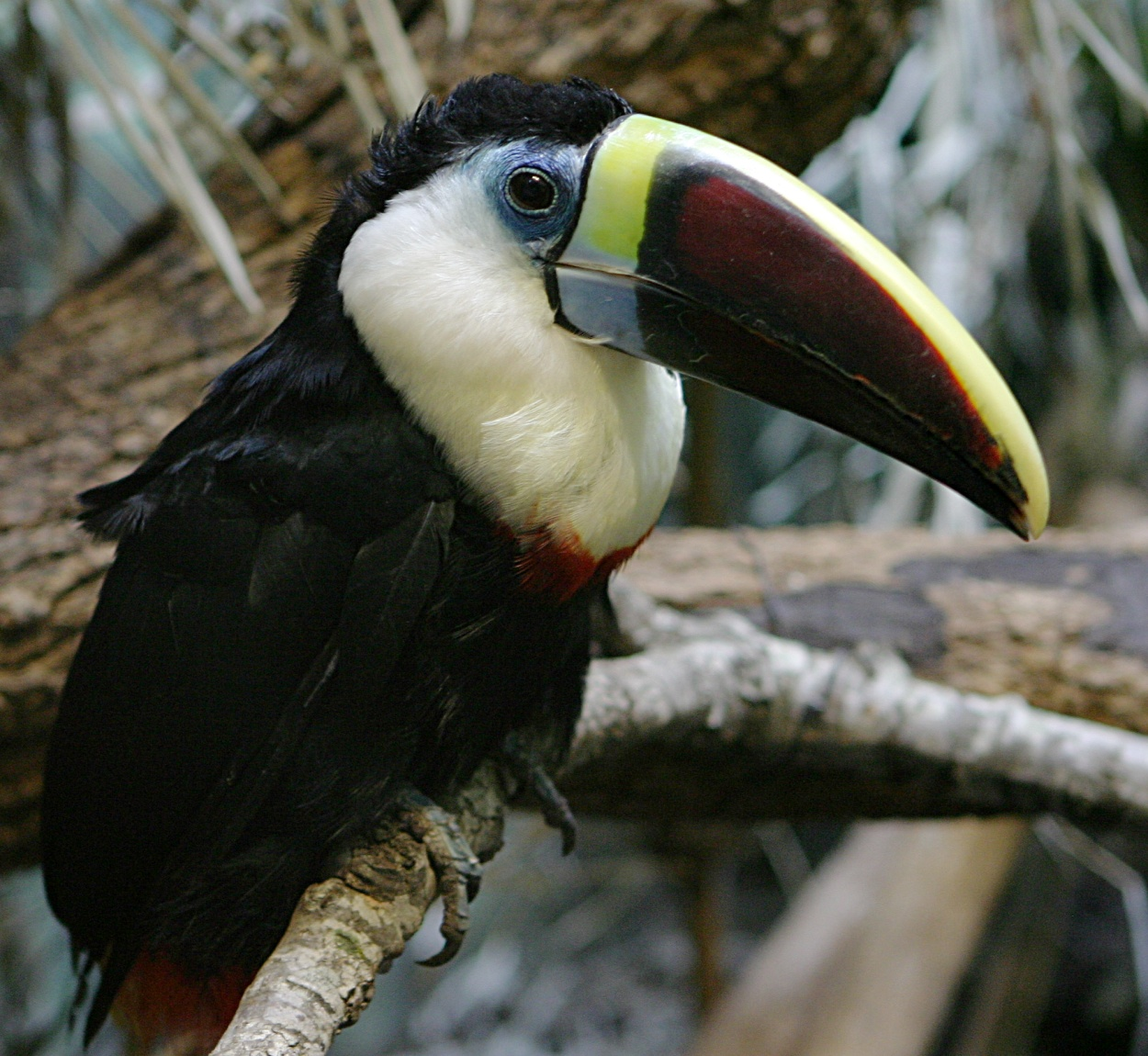
White-throated toucan (Ramphastos tucanus) inhabits the Amazon Basin

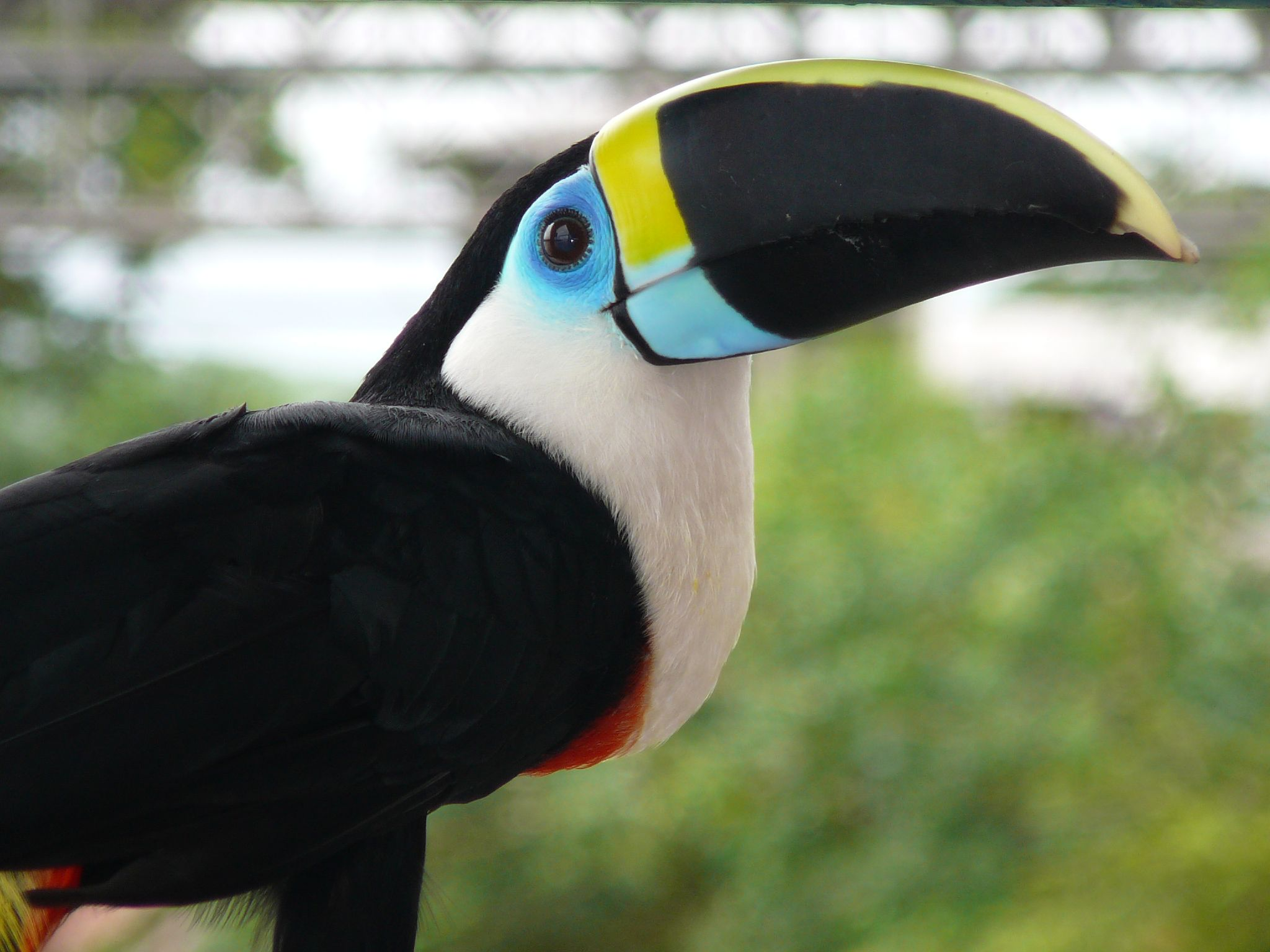
Channel-billed toucan (Ramphastos vitellinus)

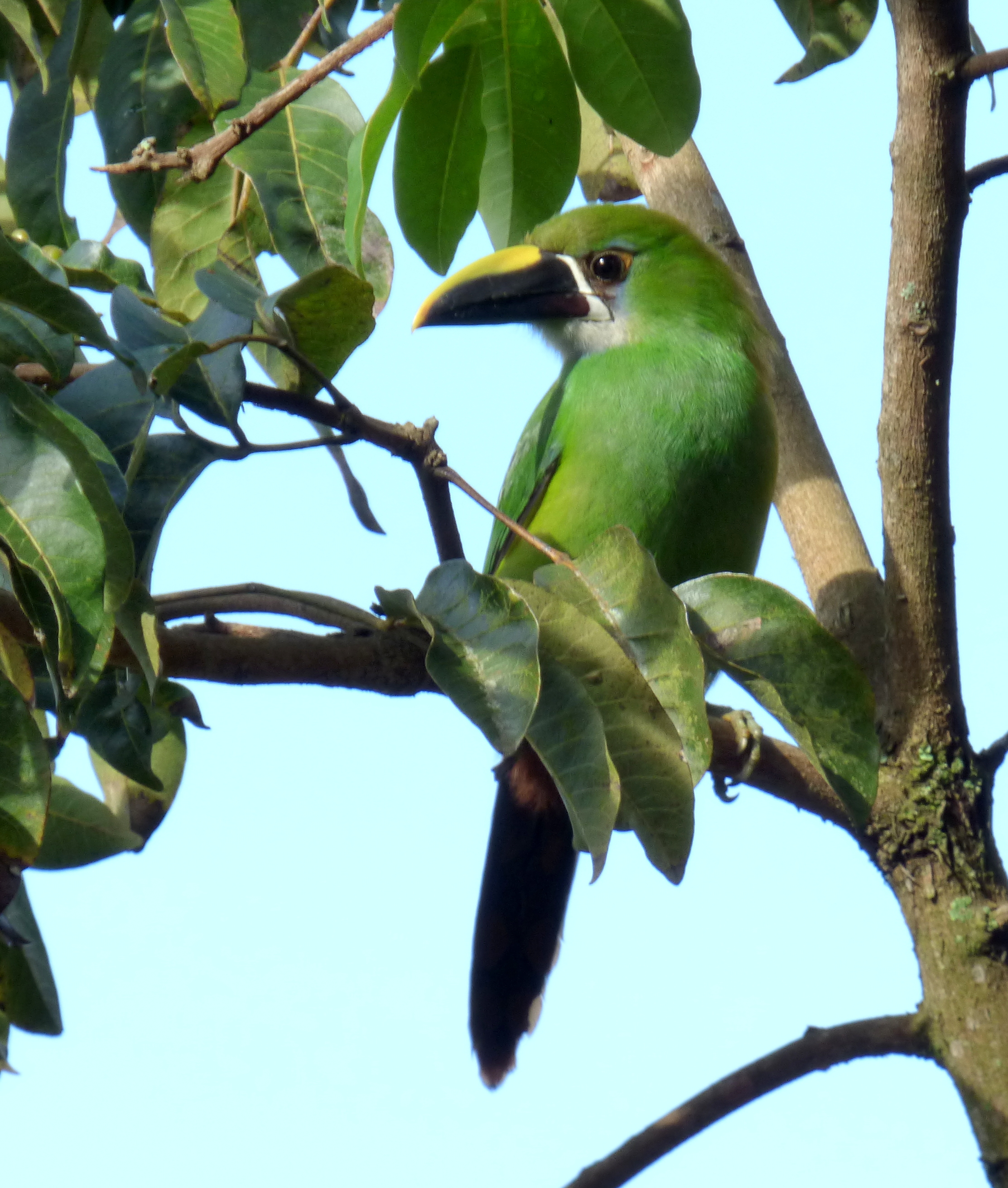
Emerald toucanet (Aulacorhynchus prasinus)

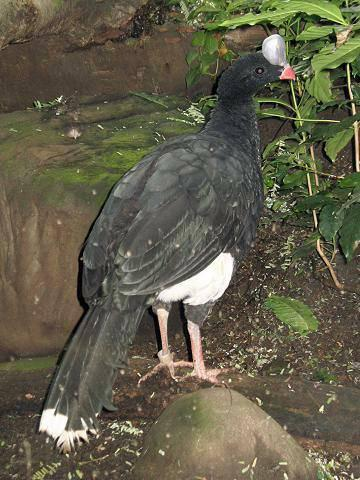
Northern helmeted curassow (Pauxi pauxi) lives in the Cordillera Oriental, Colombia mountain range

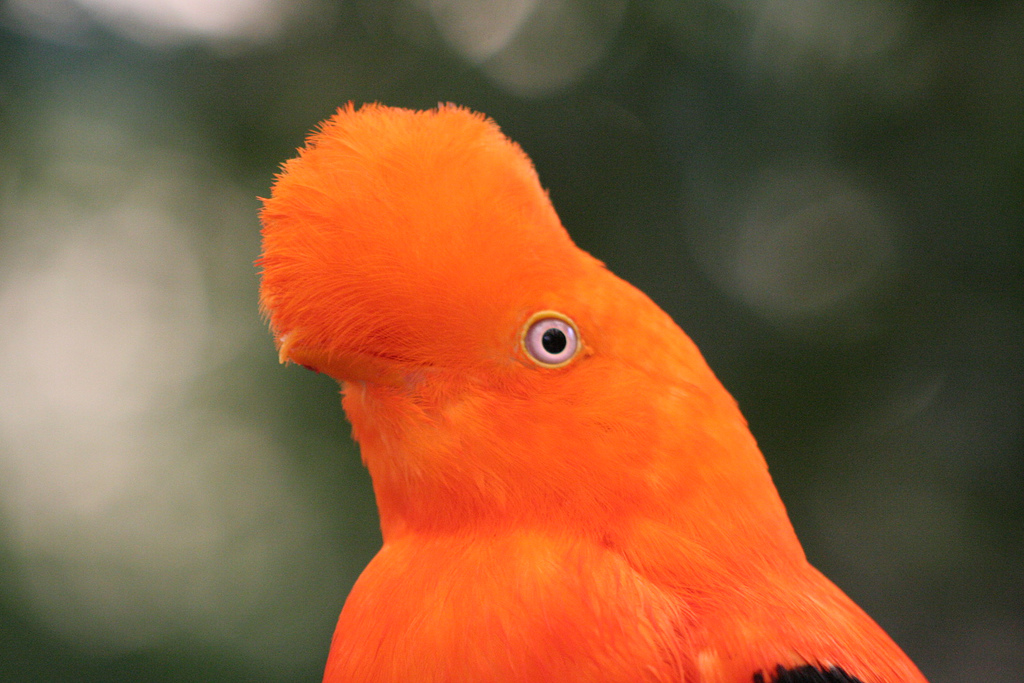
Andean cock-of-the-rock is distributed in Andean cloud forests

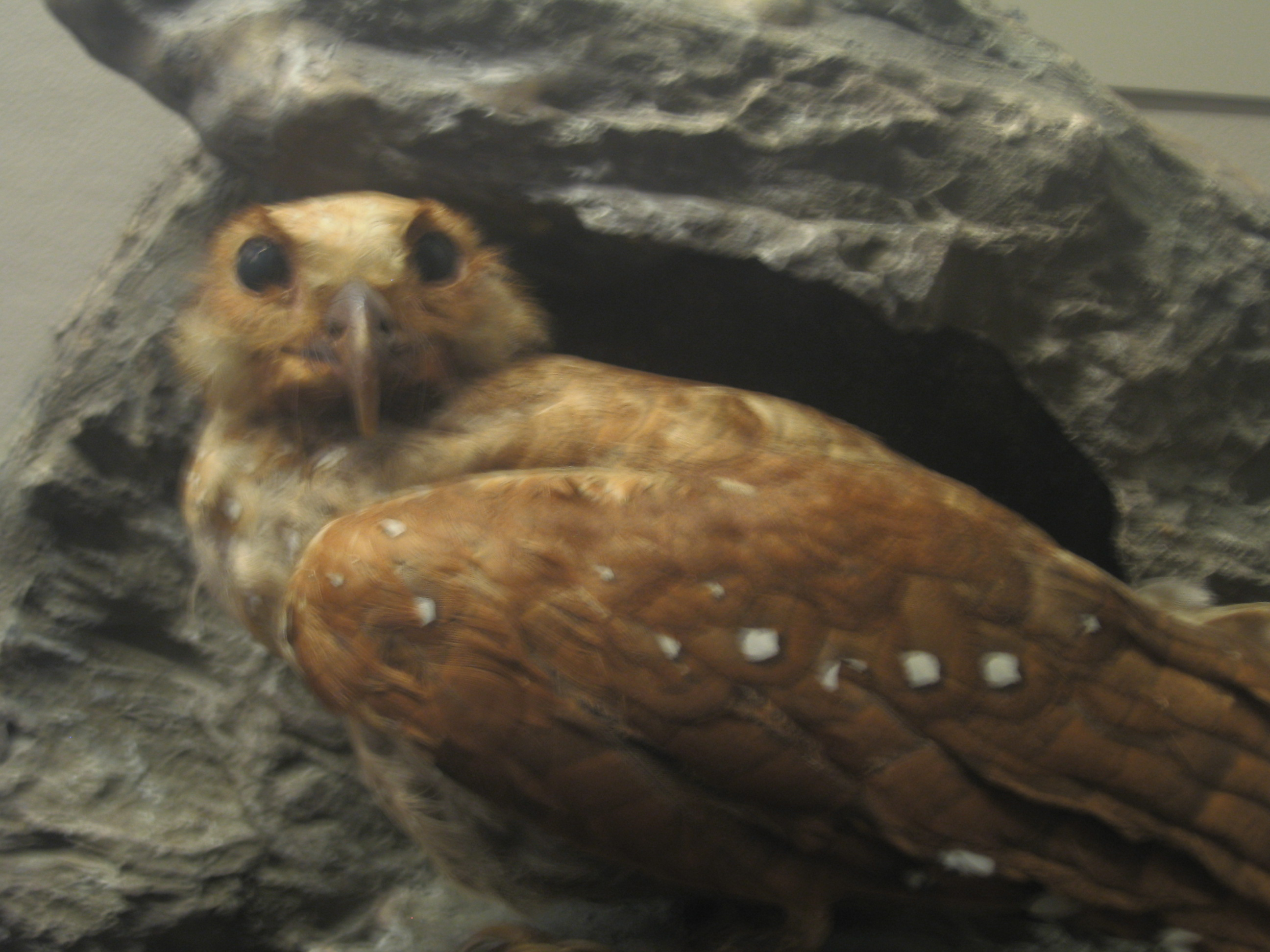
Oilbirds can be seen in Cueva de los Guacharos National Park

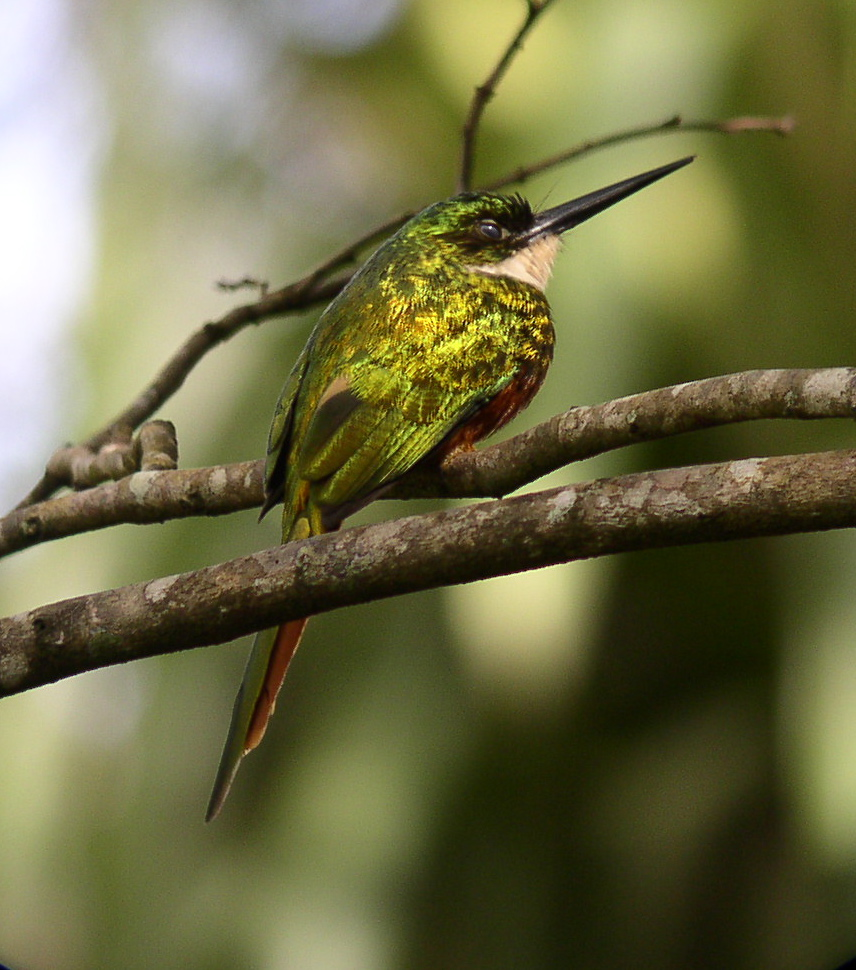
Male rufous-tailed jacamar

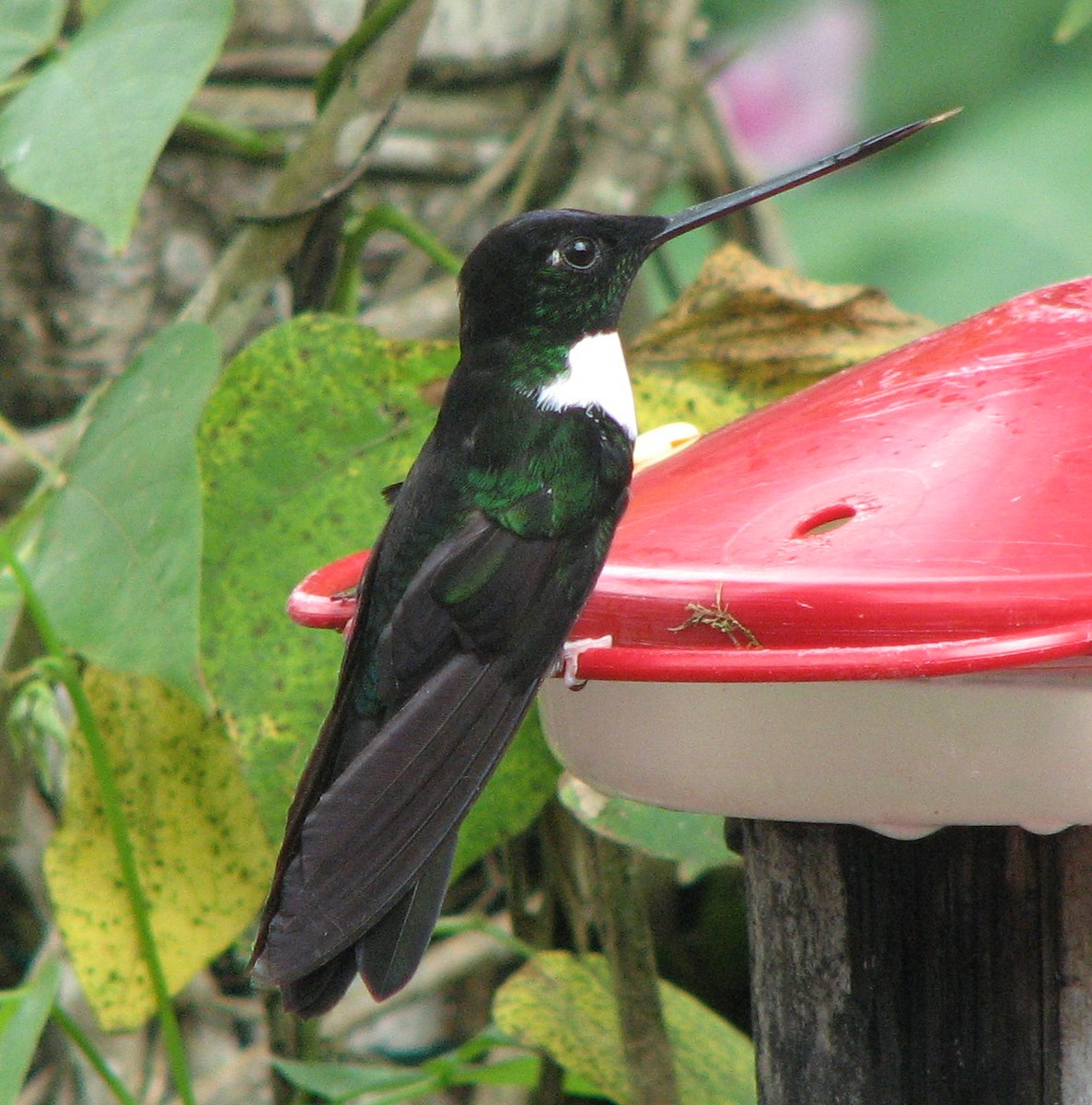
Collared inca (Coeligena torquata)

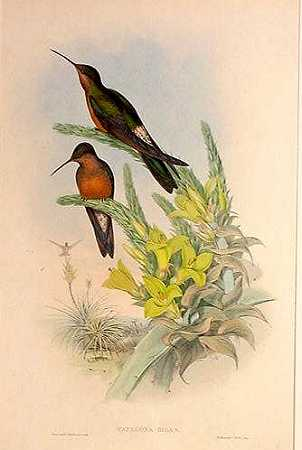
Giant hummingbird

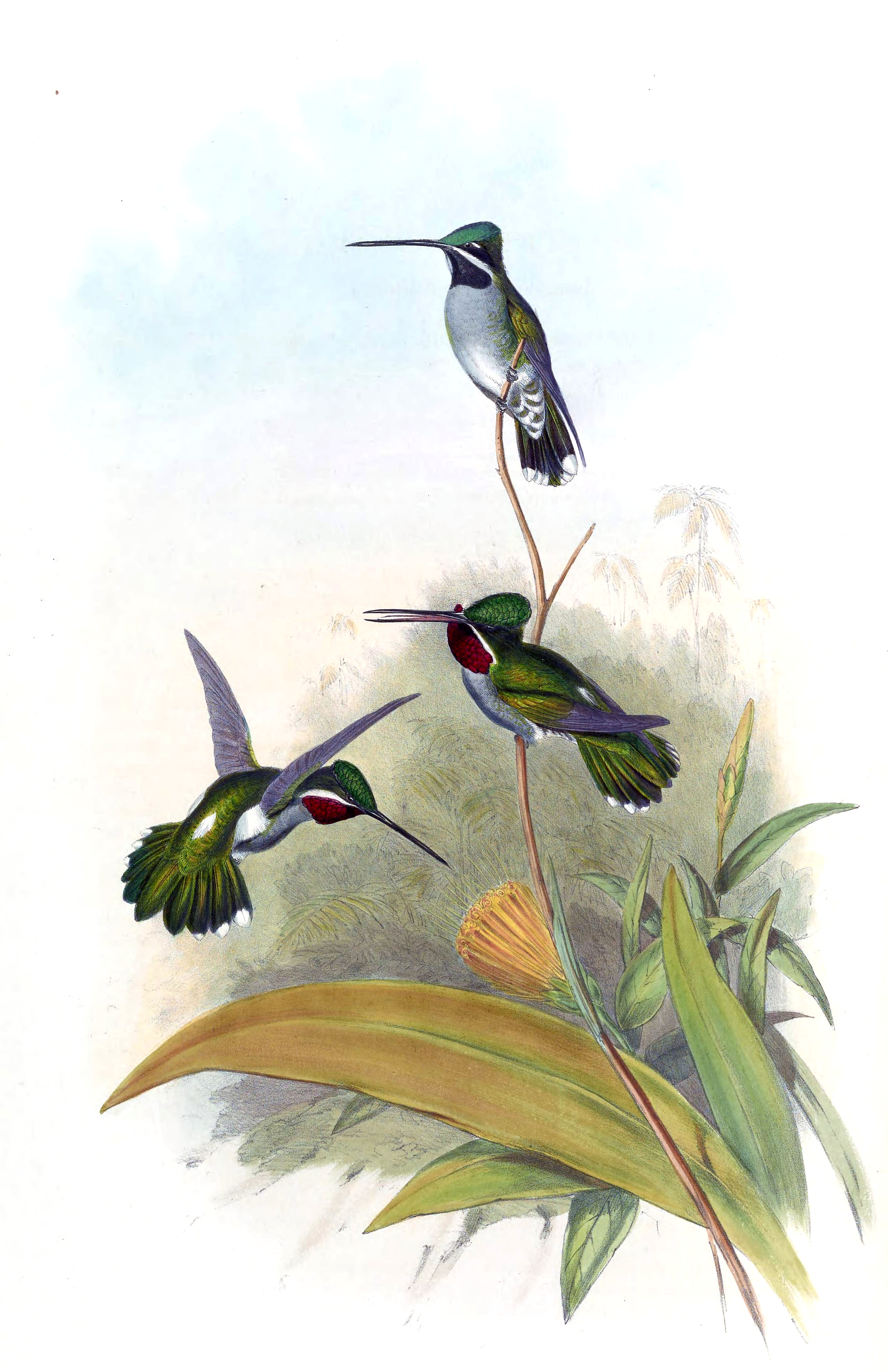
Long-billed starthroat (Heliomaster longirostris)

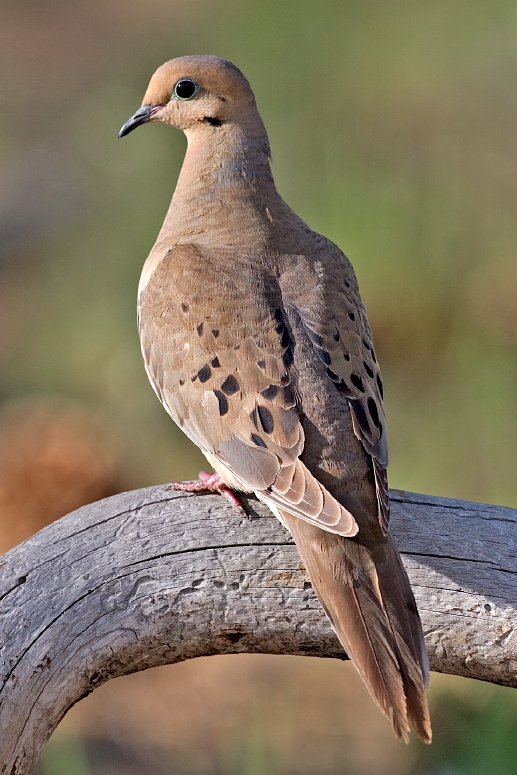
Mourning dove (Zenaida macroura)

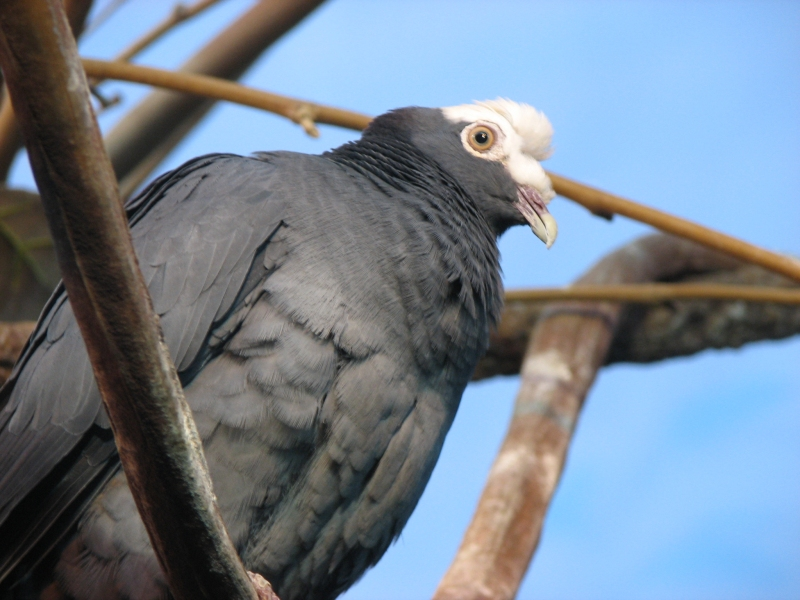
White-crowned pigeon (Patagioenas leucocephala)

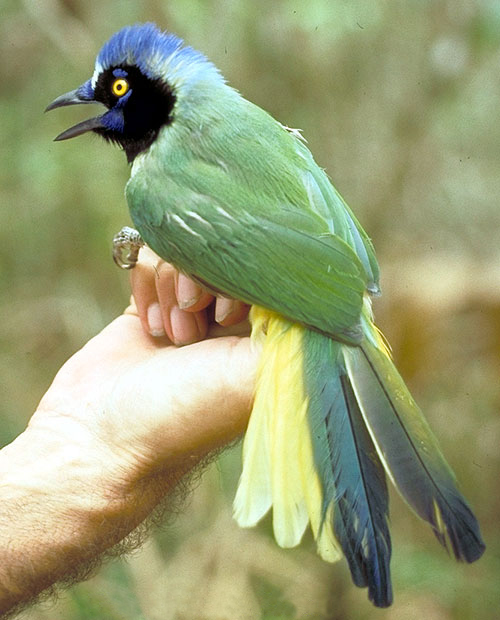
Green jay (Cyanocorax yncas)

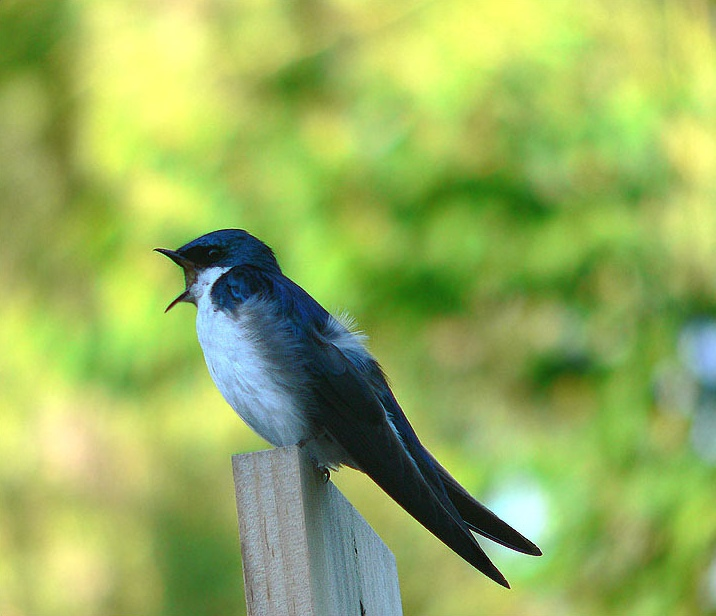
Tree swallow (Tachycineta bicolor)

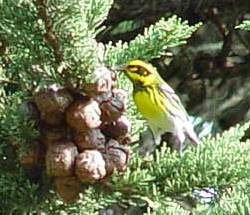
Townsend's warbler (Dendroica townsendi)

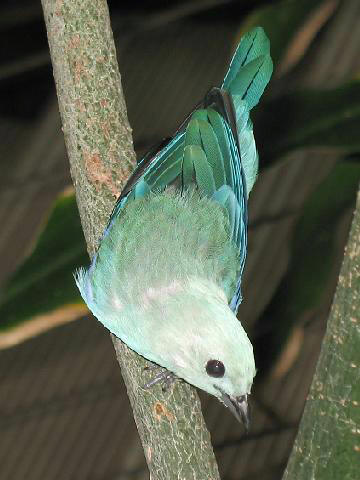
Blue-grey tanager (Thraupis episcopus)

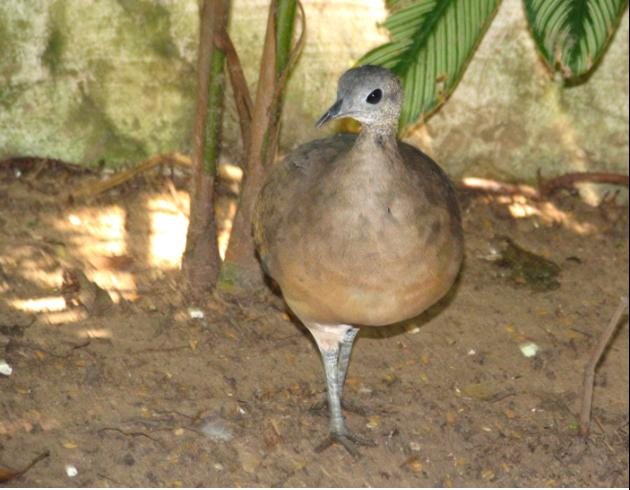
White-throated tinamou (Tinamus guttatus)

Over 1800 species of birds have been described in Colombia, (more than the number of existent bird species in North America and Europe combined). Some of the bird species in Colombia are:

- American redstart
- Groove-billed ani
- Spotted antbird
- White-plumed antbird
- Antioquia bristle-tyrant
- Northern slaty-antshrike
- Blackish-grey antshrike
- Black-faced antthrush
- White-flanked antwren
- Galapagos penguin
- Checker-throated stipplethroat
- Apical flycatcher
- Apolinar's wren
- Argus bare-eye
- Cinnamon attila
- Band-tailed barbthroat
- Pale-tailed barbthroat
- Baudó oropendola
- Beautiful woodpecker
- Bearded bellbird
- Black-and-gold tanager
- Black-chested buzzard-eagle
- Black-mandibled toucan
- Blackish tapaculo
- Bogotá rail
- Empress brilliant
- Fawn-breasted brilliant
- Brown-banded antpitta
- Buff-breasted mountain-tanager
- Red-rumped cacique
- Scarlet-rumped cacique
- Red-capped cardinal
- Grey catbird
- Little chachalaca
- Rufous-vented chachalaca
- Chestnut-bellied flower-piercer
- Chestnut-capped piha
- Chestnut-mandibled toucan
- Choco toucan
- Chocó vireo
- Clapper rail
- Andean cock-of-the-rock
- Guianan cock-of-the-rock
- Collared trogon
- Festive coquette
- Spangled coquette
- Buff-tailed coronet
- Velvet-purple coronet
- Pompadour cotinga
- Bronzed cowbird
- Crested ant-tanager
- Cundinamarca antpitta
- Great curassow
- Dickcissel
- Black-capped donacobius
- Common ground dove
- Grey-fronted dove
- Mourning dove
- White-tipped dove
- Dusky-headed brush-finch
- American harpy eagle
- Crested eagle
- Forest elaenia
- Yellow-crowned elaenia
- Andean emerald
- Blue-tailed emerald
- Glittering-throated emerald
- Versicolored emerald
- Euler's flycatcher
- Orange-bellied euphonia
- Purple-crowned fairy
- Laughing falcon
- Flame-winged parakeet
- Acadian flycatcher
- Fuscous flycatcher
- Great crested flycatcher
- Ruddy-tailed flycatcher
- Sulphur-bellied flycatcher
- Orange-breasted fruiteater
- Black-faced hawk
- Common black hawk
- Bronzy hermit
- Great-billed hermit
- Green hermit
- Grey-chinned hermit
- Long-billed hermit
- Reddish hermit
- Rufous-breasted hermit
- Sooty-capped hermit
- Stripe-throated hermit
- Tawny-bellied hermit
- White-whiskered hermit
- Zigzag heron
- Purple honeycreeper
- Giant hummingbird
- Green-bellied hummingbird
- Indigo-capped hummingbird
- Ruby-topaz hummingbird
- Rufous-tailed hummingbird
- Snowy-breasted hummingbird
- Speckled hummingbird
- Steely-vented hummingbird
- Violet-bellied hummingbird
- Buff-necked ibis
- Brown inca
- Collared inca
- Bronzy jacamar
- Green-tailed jacamar
- Pale-headed jacamar
- Paradise jacamar
- Rufous-tailed jacamar
- Yellow-billed jacamar
- White-necked jacobin
- Green jay
- American pygmy kingfisher
- Great kiskadee
- Long-wattled umbrellabird
- Blue-backed manakin
- Lance-tailed manakin
- Wire-tailed manakin
- Green-breasted mango
- Tyrian metaltail
- Tropical mockingbird
- Amazonian motmot
- Andean motmot
- Whooping motmot
- Rufous motmot
- Mountain grackle
- Moustached brush-finch
- Multicoloured tanager
- Niceforo's wren
- Lesser nighthawk
- Northern helmeted curassow
- Brown nunlet
- Rusty-breasted nunlet
- Oilbird
- Baltimore oriole
- Orchard oriole
- South American yellow oriole
- Pale-legged warbler
- Parker's antbird
- Mealy amazon
- Yellow-eared parrot
- Green-rumped parrotlet
- Western wood pewee
- Black phoebe
- Band-tailed pigeon
- Ruddy pigeon
- Short-billed pigeon
- Collared puffbird
- Russet-throated puffbird
- White-necked puffbird
- Colorful puffleg
- Gorgeted puffleg
- Golden-headed quetzal
- White-tipped quetzal
- Booted racket-tail
- Red-bellied grackle
- Royal flycatcher
- Rufous-breasted wren
- Rufous-fronted parakeet
- Rufous-tailed antthrush
- Rusty-headed spinetail
- Santa Marta antpitta
- Santa Marta brush-finch
- Santa Marta bush-tyrant
- Santa Marta mountain-tanager
- Santa Marta parakeet
- Santa Marta tapaculo
- Santa Marta warbler
- Santa Marta wren
- Blue-chinned sapphire
- Scarlet macaw
- Black-necked screamer
- Horned screamer
- Variable seedeater
- Buff-tailed sicklebill
- White-tipped sicklebill
- Silvery-throated spinetail
- Red siskin
- Yellow-bellied siskin
- Sooty ant-tanager
- Sooty-capped puffbird
- Orange-billed sparrow
- Blue-tufted starthroat
- Long-billed starthroat
- Black storm-petrel
- Least storm-petrel
- Streak-capped spinetail
- Gorgeted sunangel
- Orange-throated sunangel
- Tree swallow
- Swallow-wing
- Short-tailed swift
- Sick's swift
- Violet-tailed sylph
- Blue-grey tanager
- Fulvous-crested tanager
- Paradise tanager
- Scarlet tanager
- Turquoise tanager
- White-shouldered tanager
- Green thorntail
- Wire-crested thorntail
- Spectacled thrush
- Wood thrush
- Barred tinamou
- Berlepsch's tinamou
- Black tinamou
- Brown tinamou
- Choco tinamou
- Cinereous tinamou
- Colombian tinamou
- Great tinamou
- Grey tinamou
- Grey-legged tinamou
- Highland tinamou
- Little tinamou
- Magdalena tinamou
- Red-legged tinamou
- Rusty tinamou
- Tawny-breasted tinamou
- Undulated tinamou
- Variegated tinamou
- White-throated tinamou
- Tolima dove
- Channel-billed toucan
- Keel-billed toucan
- White-throated toucan
- Emerald toucanet
- Groove-billed toucanet
- Slaty-tailed trogon
- Grey-winged trumpeter
- Buffy tuftedcheek
- Streaked tuftedcheek
- Turquoise dacnis
- Turquoise-throated puffleg
- Southern beardless tyrannulet
- Upper Magdalena tapaculo
- Velvet-fronted euphonia
- Violaceous trogon
- Brown violetear
- Lesser violetear
- Sparkling violetear
- Black-and-white warbler
- Black-throated green warbler
- Blackpoll warbler
- Palm warbler
- Prairie warbler
- Townsend's warbler
- Yellow warbler
- Waved albatross
- Cedar waxwing
- White-crowned pigeon
- White-lored warbler
- White-mantled barbet
- Purple-bibbed whitetip
- Amazonian barred-woodcreeper
- Black-banded woodcreeper
- Straight-billed woodcreeper
- Violet-crowned woodnymph
- Acorn woodpecker
- Ringed woodpecker
- Yellow-throated woodpecker
- Purple-throated woodstar
- Band-backed wren
- Stripe-backed wren
- Yariguies brush-finch
- Yellow-crowned redstart
- Yellow-headed brush-finch
- Yellow-rumped warbler

=== The national bird ===
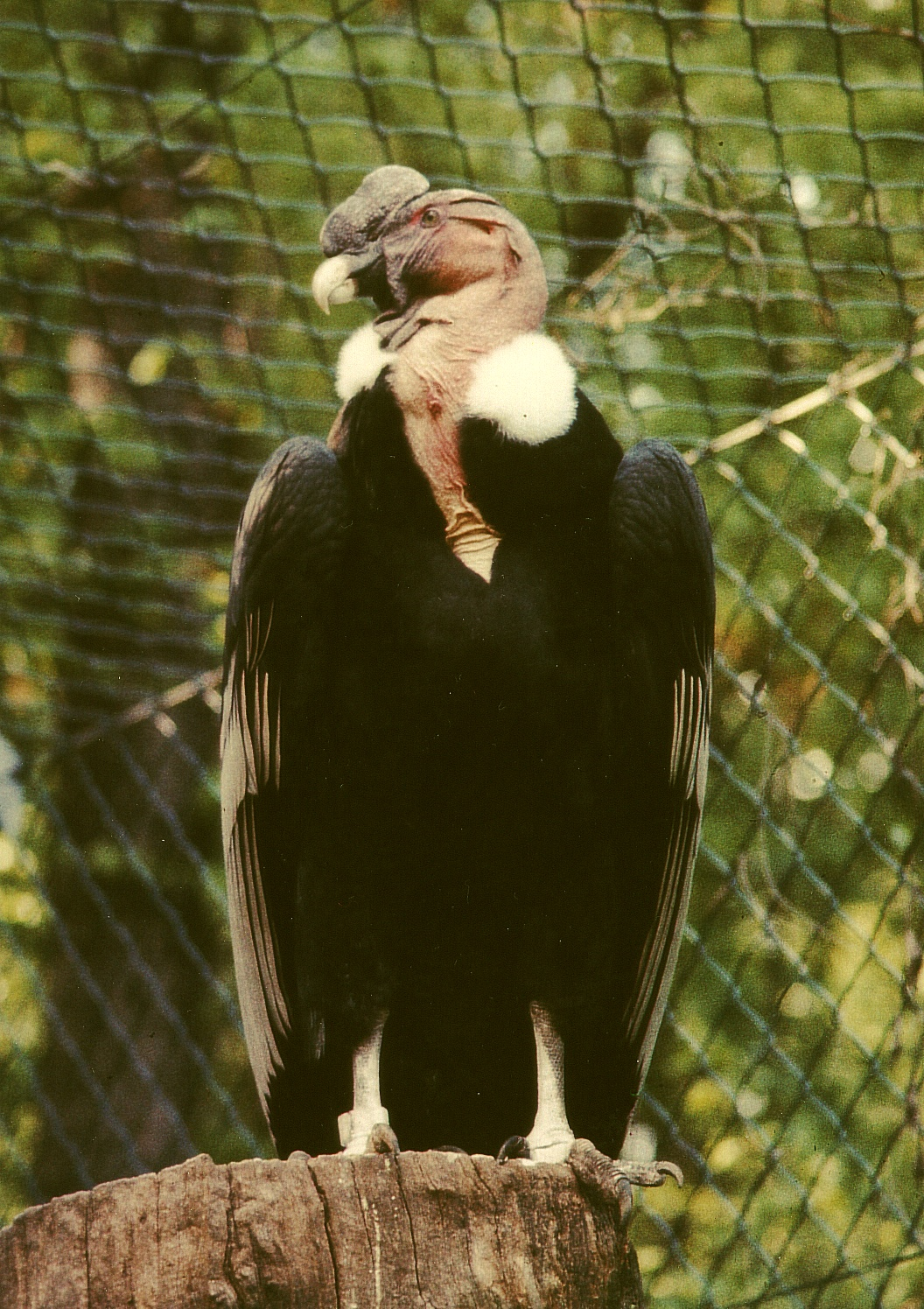
The Vultur gryphus also known as the Andean condor is the national bird of Colombia.

The Andean condor inhabits the Andes mountain range. Although it is primarily a scavenger, feeding on carrion, this species belongs to the New World vulture family Cathartidae.

The condor is one of the largest birds on earth with a wingspan ranging from 274 to 310 cm (108–122 in) and weighing up to 11–15 kg (24–33 lb) for males and 7.5–11 kg (16–24 lb) for females, but overall length can range from 117 to 135 cm (46 to 53 inches).

The adult plumage is of a uniform black, with the exception of a frill of white feathers nearly surrounding the base of the neck and, especially in the male, large patches or bands of white on the wings which do not appear until the completion of the first molting.

== Mammals ==
There are 456 reported species of mammals in Colombia. Of these, about 22% are endangered or critically endangered. Most of the threatened species status are due to human activities, in particular destruction of plant and animal habitats driven by local consumption of organic resources, especially related to tropical forest destruction.

While most of the species that are becoming extinct are not food species, their biomass is converted into human food when their habitat is transformed into pasture and cropland.

Colombia has the largest number of terrestrial mammals species in the world, including among others:

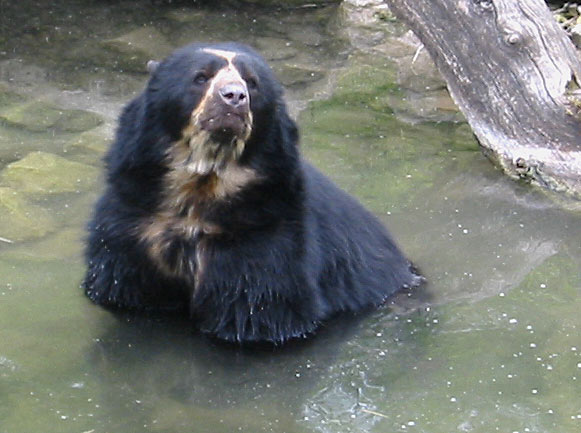
The spectacled bear another rare mammal species, similar to the giant panda in Asia.

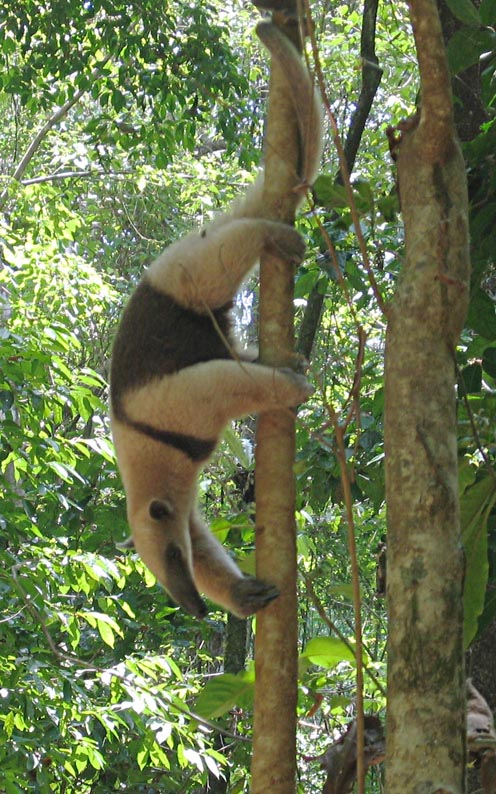
Tamandua tetradactyla

Callicebus cupreus

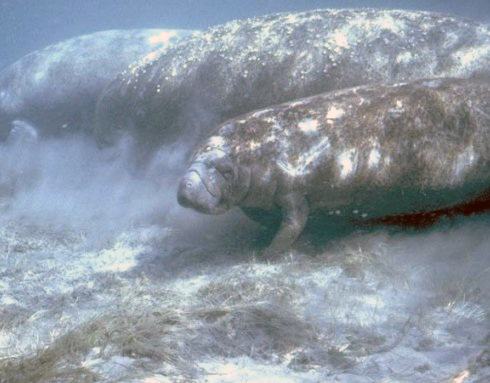
West Indian manatee

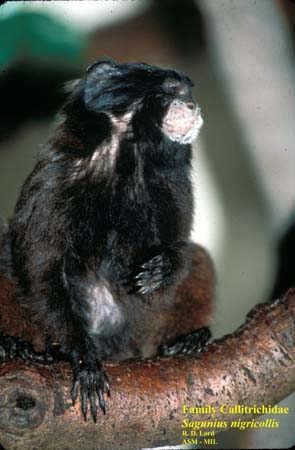
Black-mantled tamarin

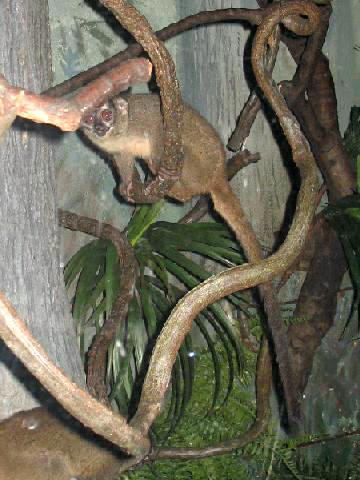
Three-striped night monkey

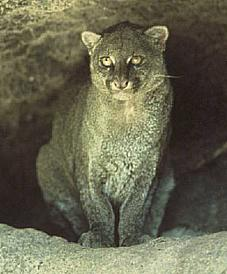
Jaguarundi

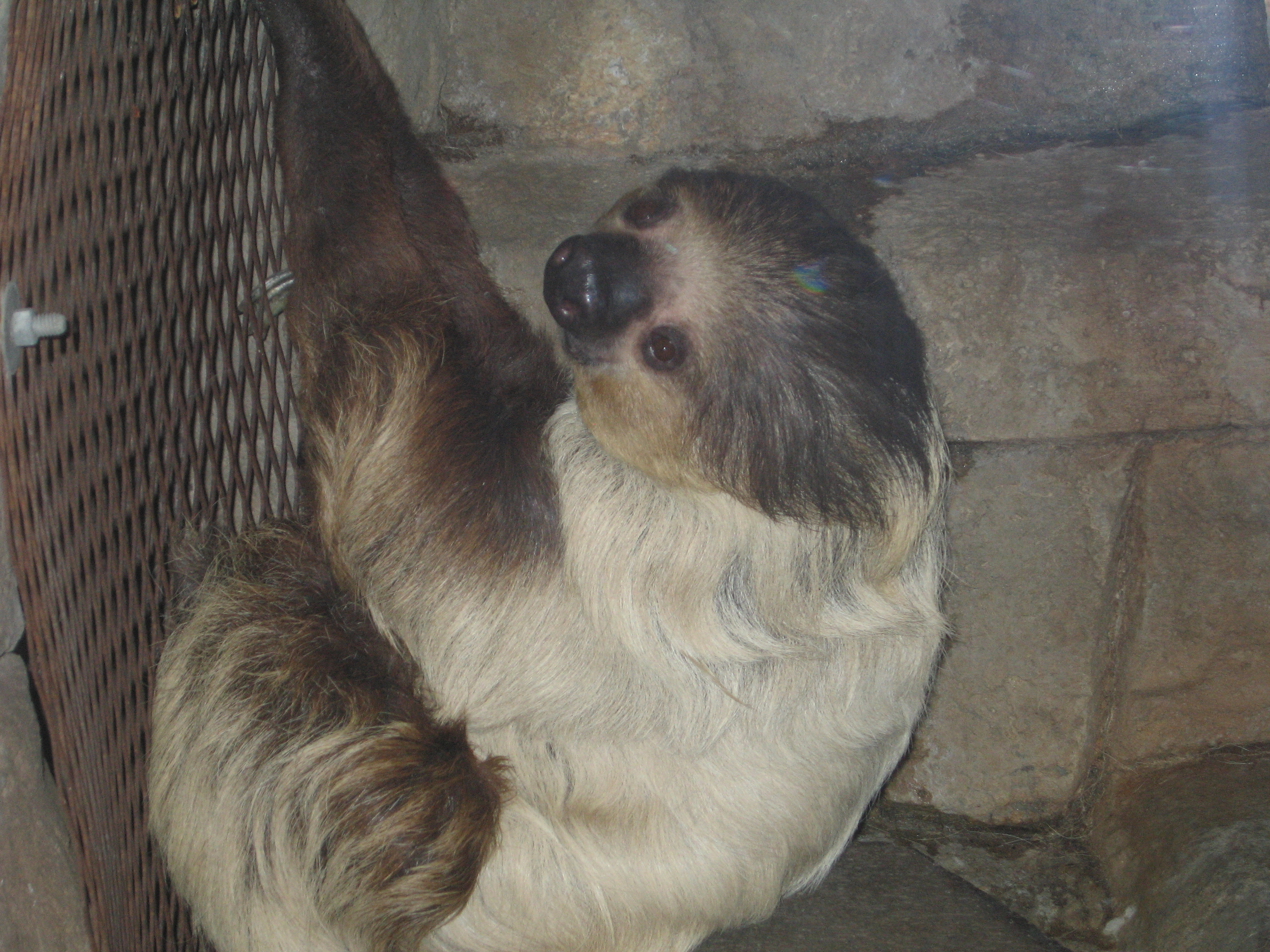
Hoffmann's two-toed sloth

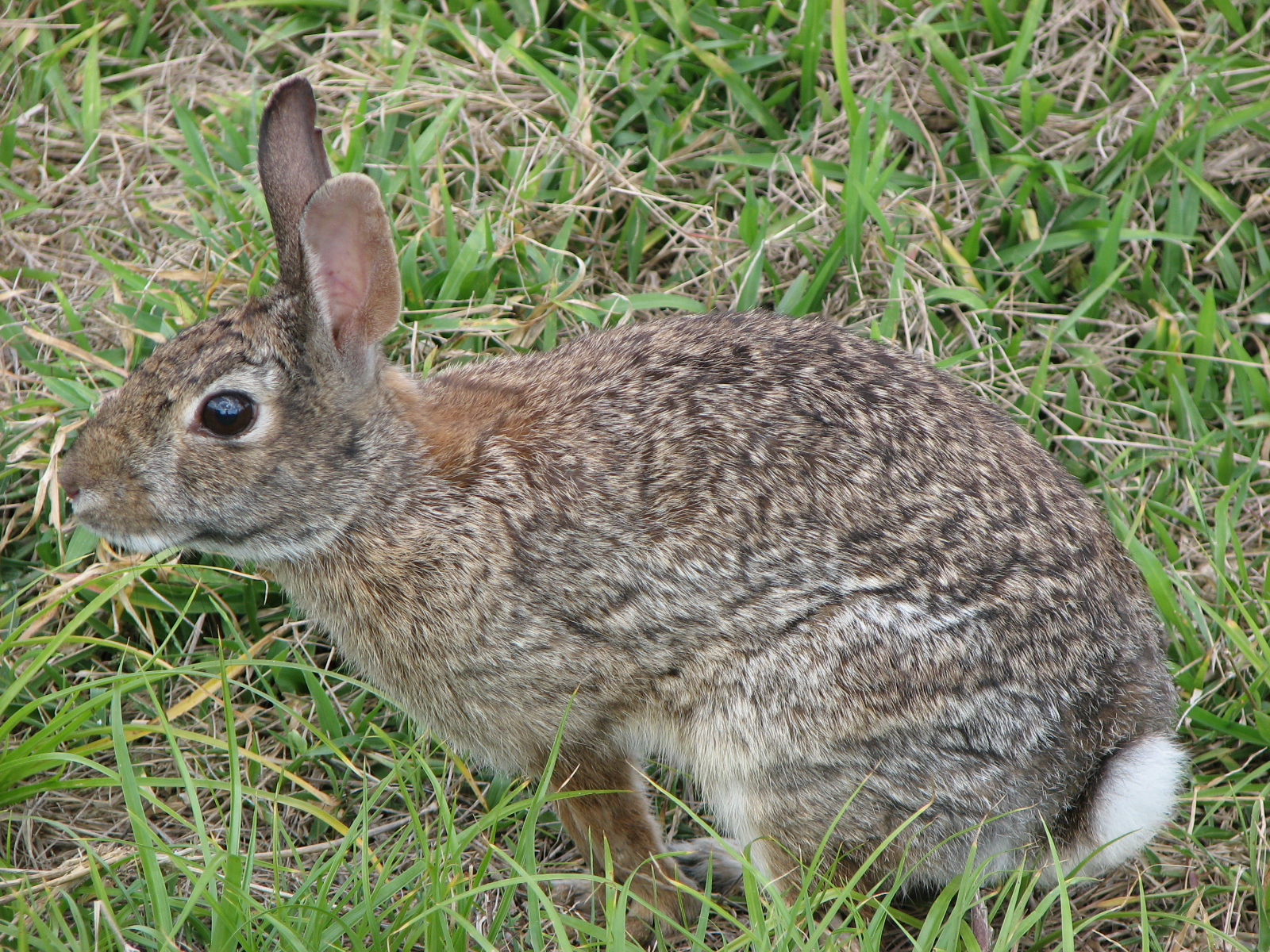
Eastern cottontail (Sylvilagus floridanus)

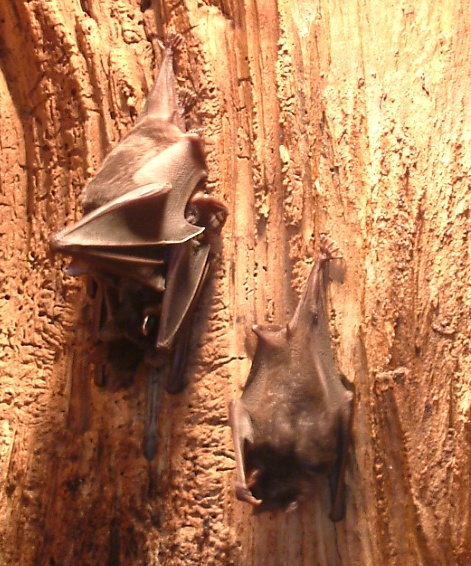
Pale spear-nosed bat

- Colombian woolly monkey
- Colombian black-handed titi
- Coppery titi
- Lucifer titi
- Black titi
- Collared titi
- Ornate titi
- White-fronted capuchin
- Olinguito
- Giant anteater
- Giant armadillo
- Greater long-nosed armadillo
- Hoffmann's two-toed sloth
- Jaguar
- Cougar
- Linnaeus's two-toed sloth
- Nine-banded armadillo
- Pale-throated thripee-toed sloth
- Pygmy marmoset
- Silky anteater
- Southern naked-tailed armadillo
- Southern tamandua
- Spectacled bear
- Brown-throated three-toed sloth
- Amazonian manatee
- West Indian manatee
- Hippopotamus. Most of the animals in Pablo Escobar's personal zoo were shipped back to their natural habitats except the hippopotamus; some escaped, and a wild population has established itself in Colombia's main river, the Magdelena. Spread over a growing area, nobody knows exactly how many there are, or what will be their lasting effect on the environment, but estimates of the total population in 2020 range from 40 to 60 individuals.

== Amphibians ==
Colombia has the largest number of amphibians in the world (including frogs, toads, salamanders and caecilians) with 589 species, 208 of them being endangered, being the zoological group with the highest rate of endangerment. Some causes related with the decline of the amphibians are: chytridiomycosis, habitat destruction, drought, air pollution, water pollution and illegal trade.

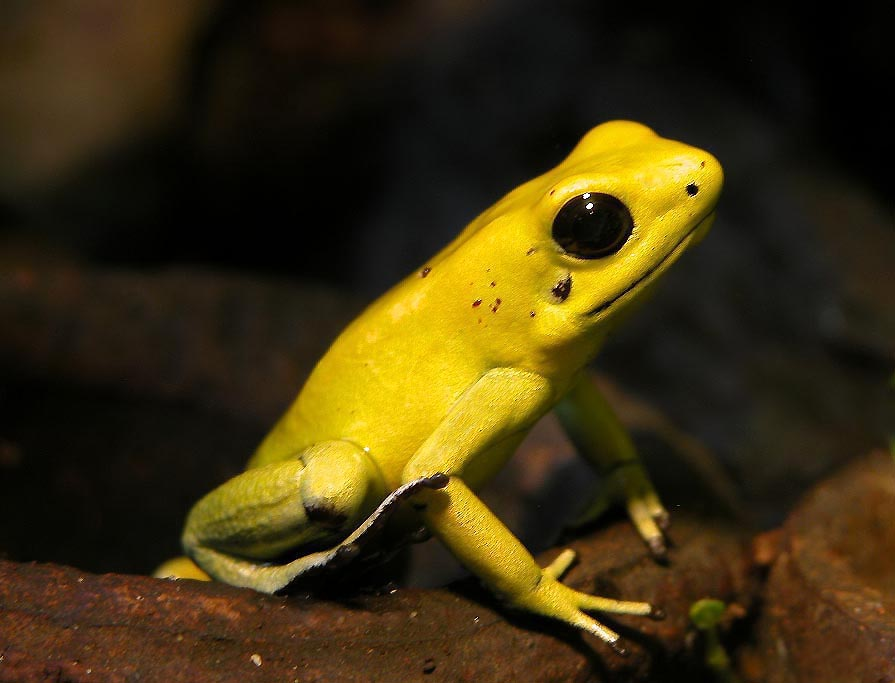
Phyllobates terribilis is the most poisonous vertebrate worldwide

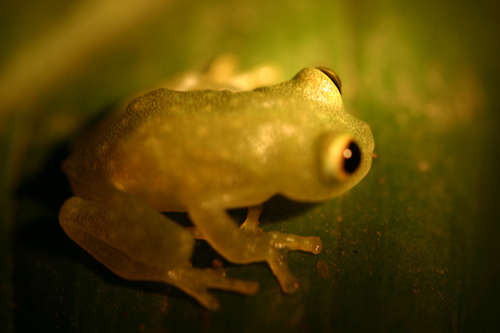
Hyalinobatrachium fleischmanni, Fleischmann's glass frog.

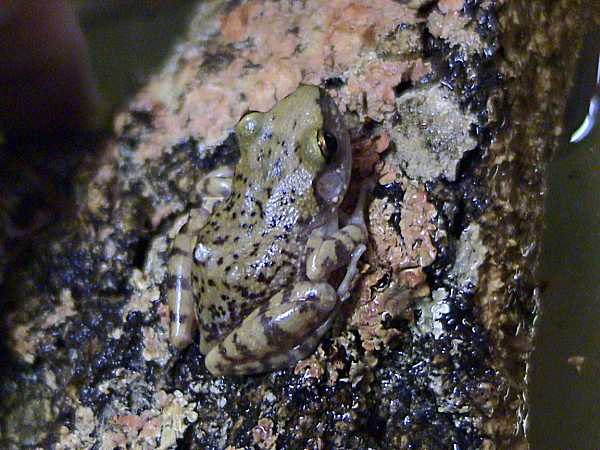
Eleutherodactylus marnockii, rain frog

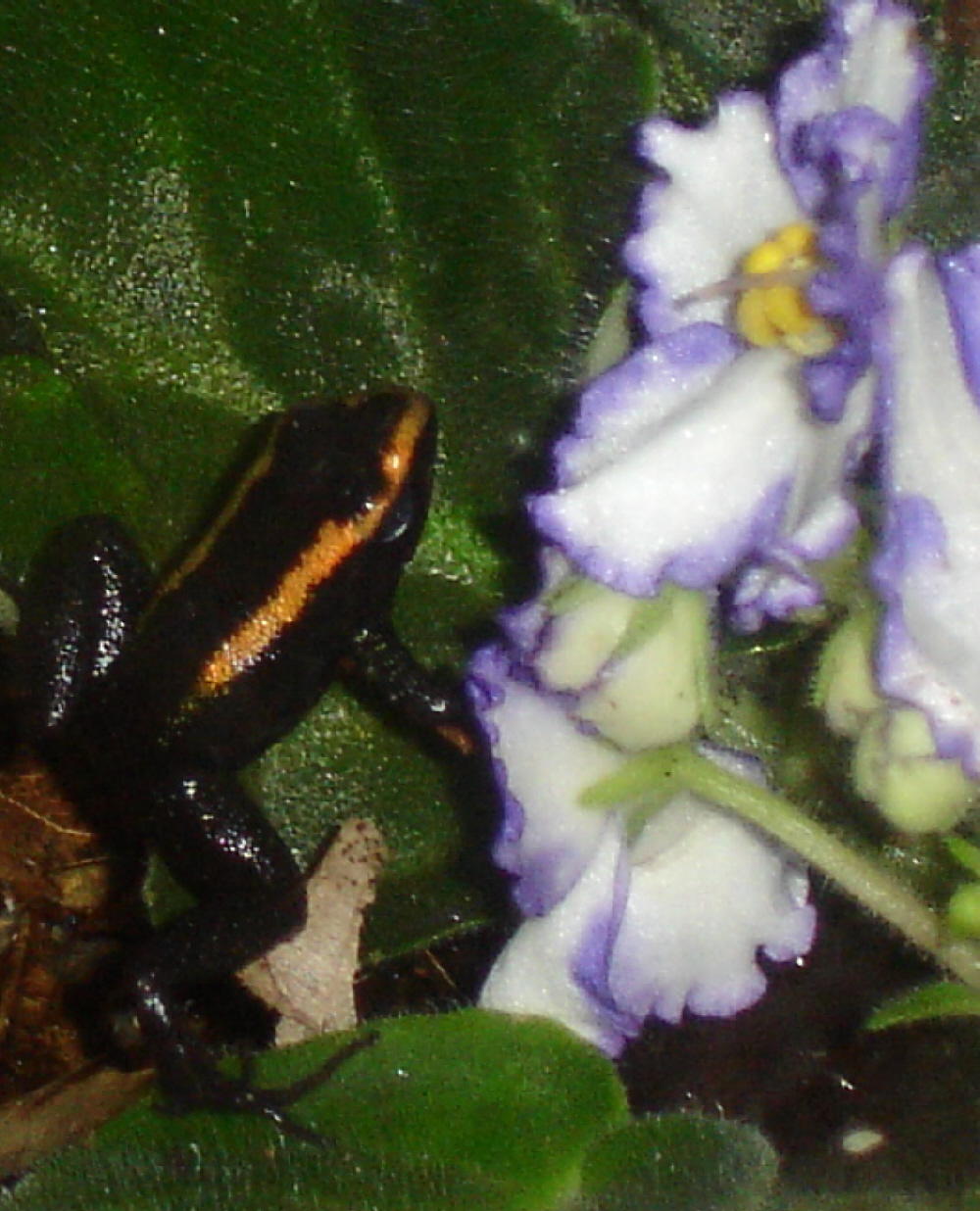
Phyllobates aurotaenia, Kokoe dart frog

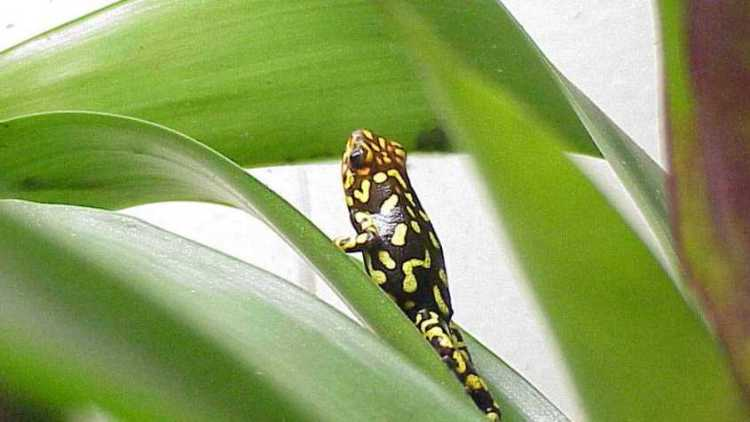
Harlequin poison frog, Dendrobates histrionicus

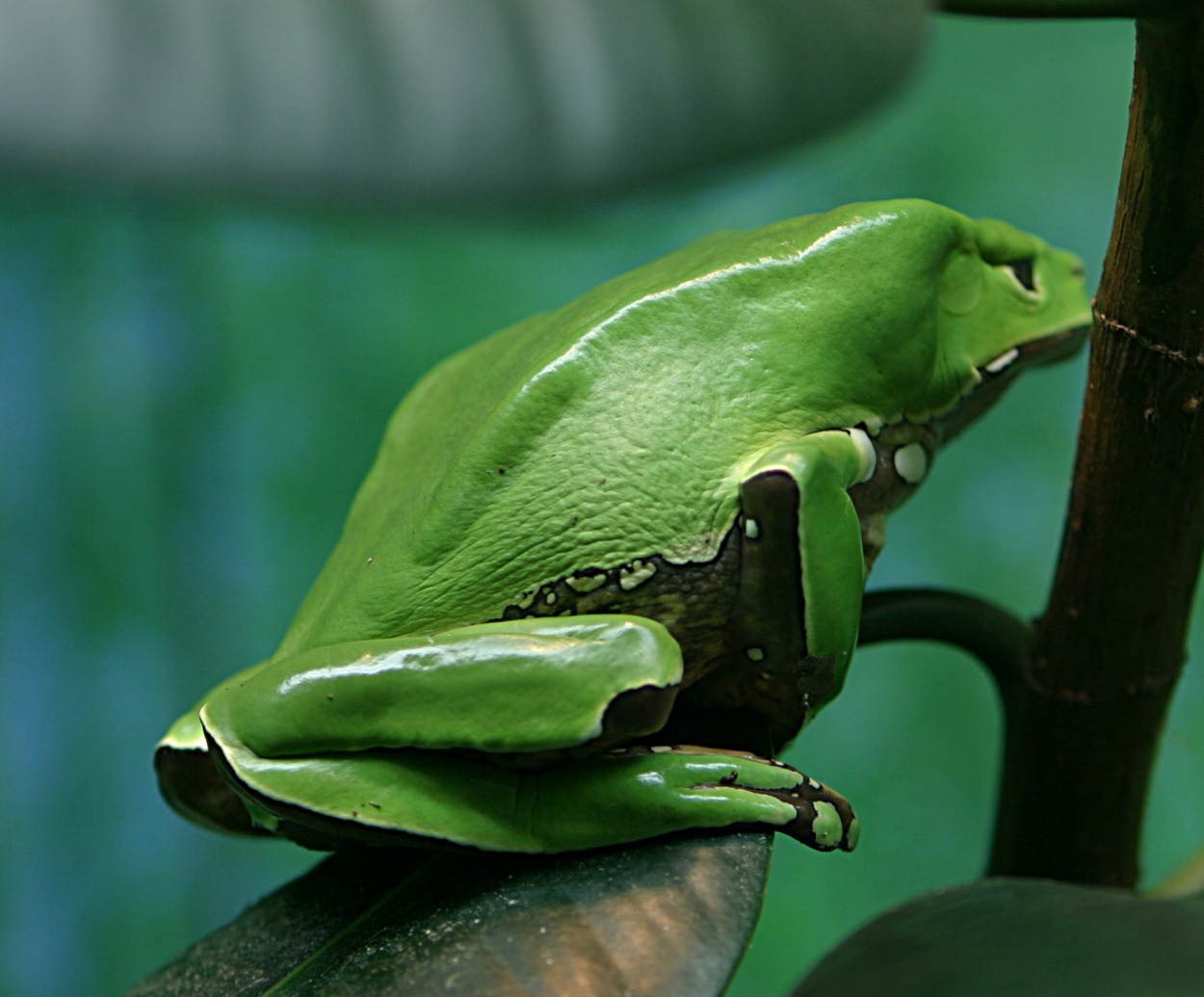
Giant leaf frog, Phyllomedusa bicolor

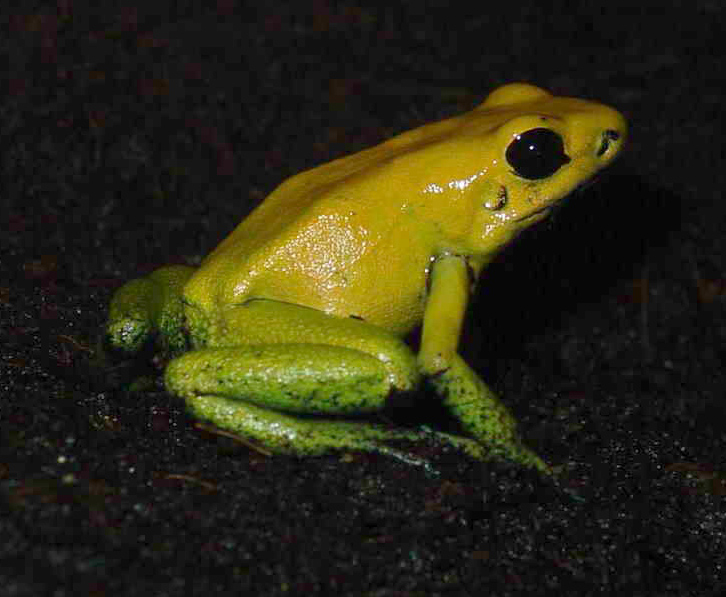
Black-legged dart frog, Phyllobates bicolor

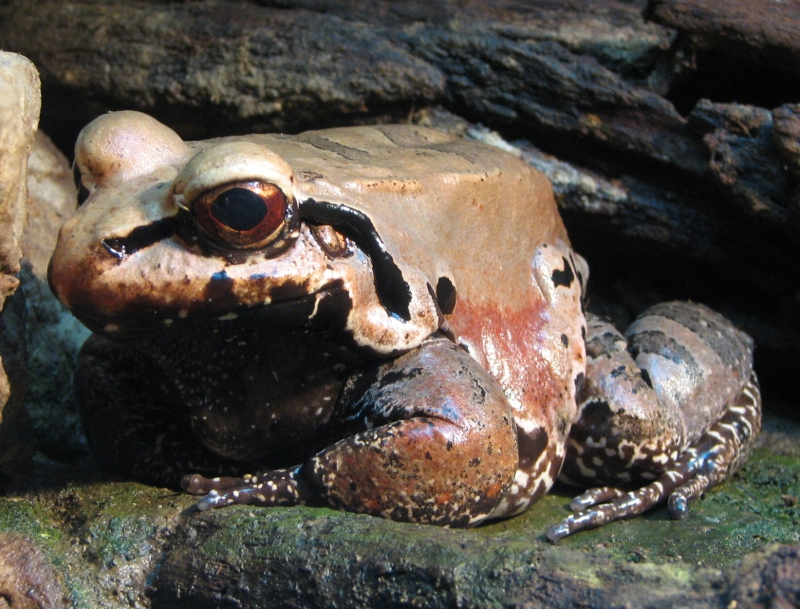
Sapo toro, Leptodactylus pentadactylus

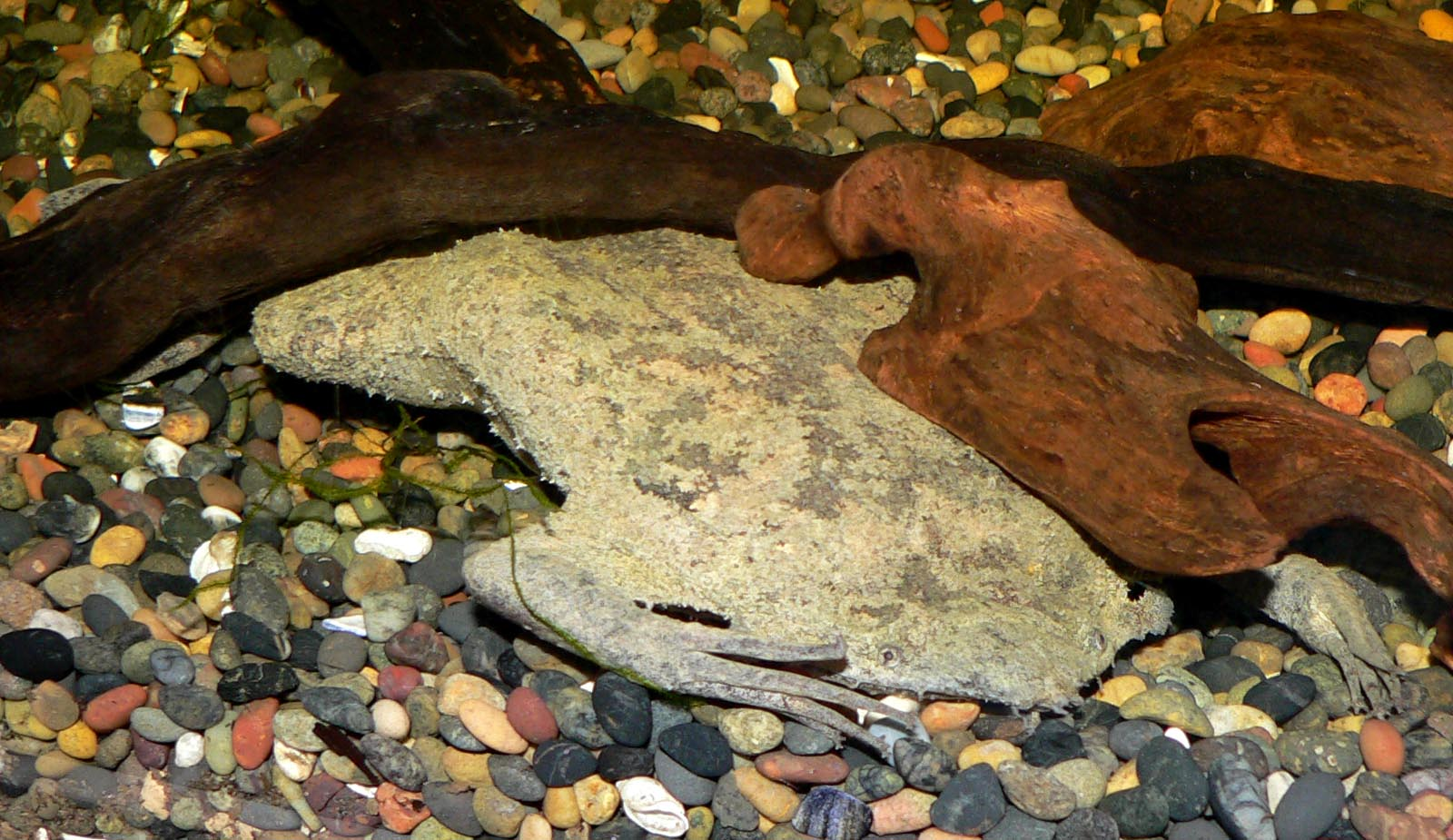
Sapo de celdas, Pipa pipa

== Reptiles ==
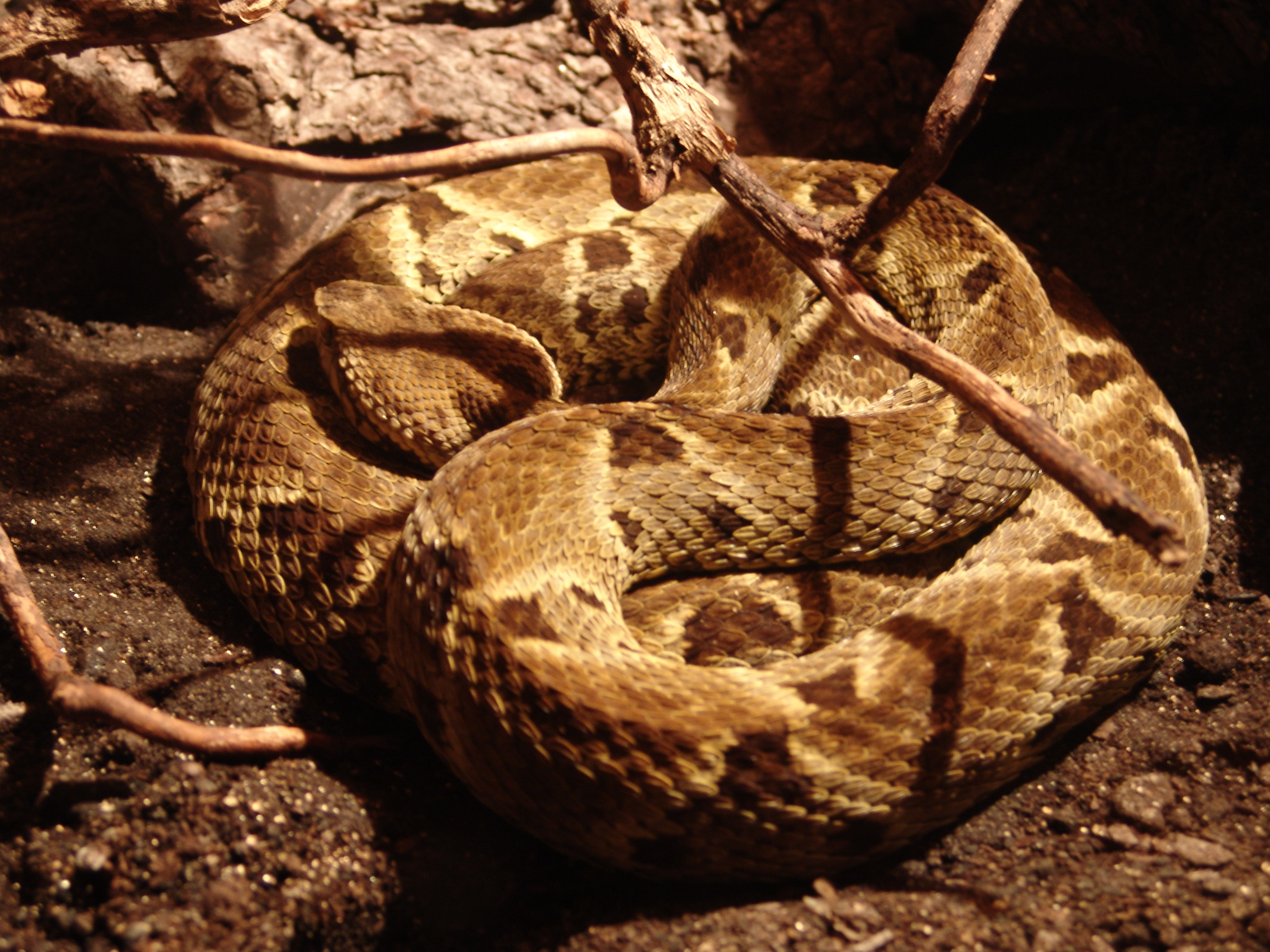
Bothrops atrox is the main cause of death for snakebite in Colombia.

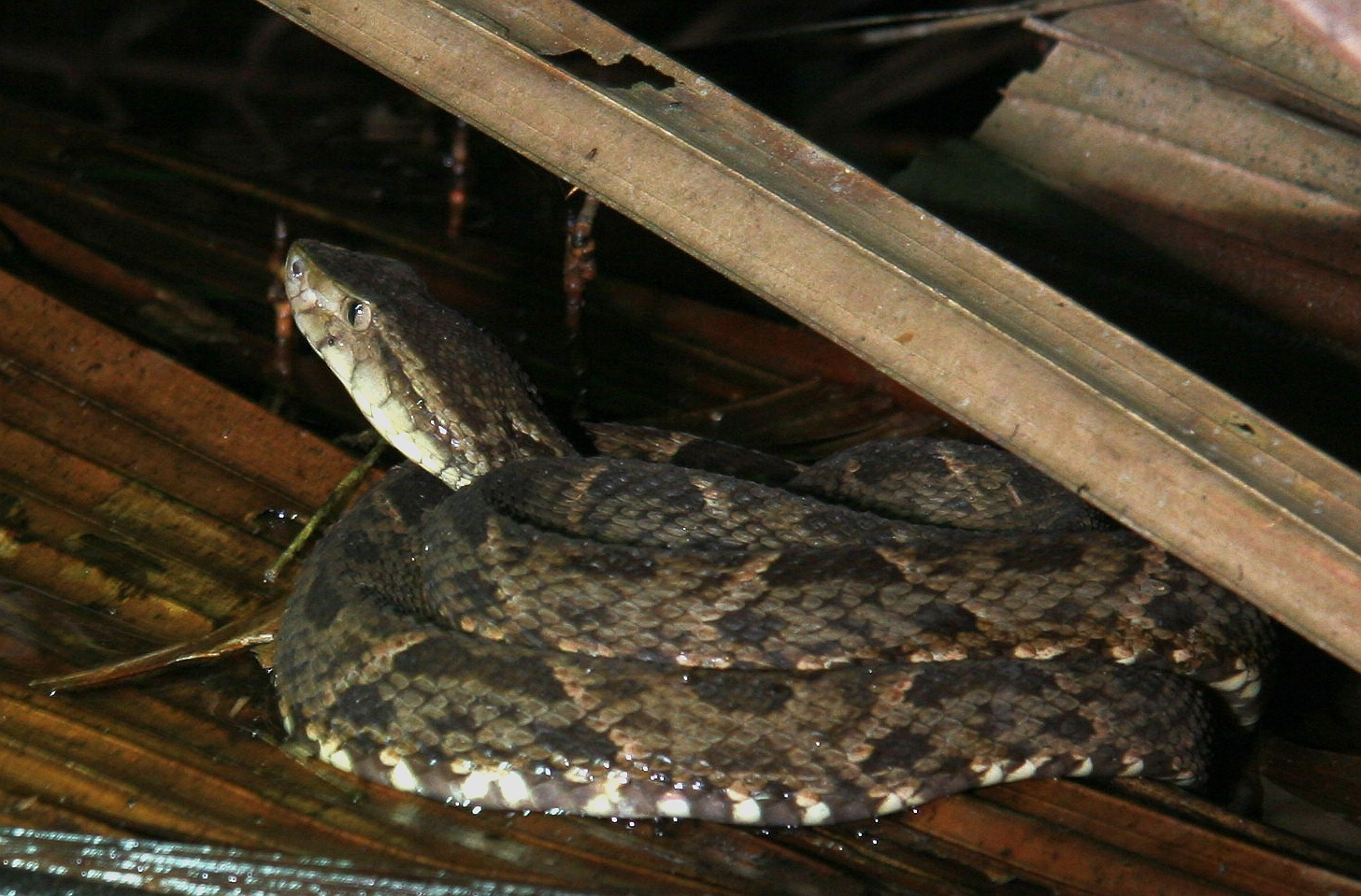
Bothrops asper

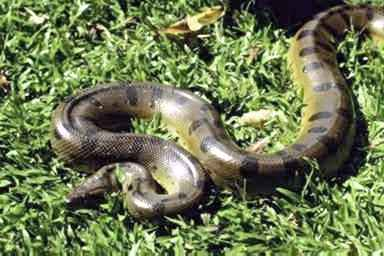
Green anaconda

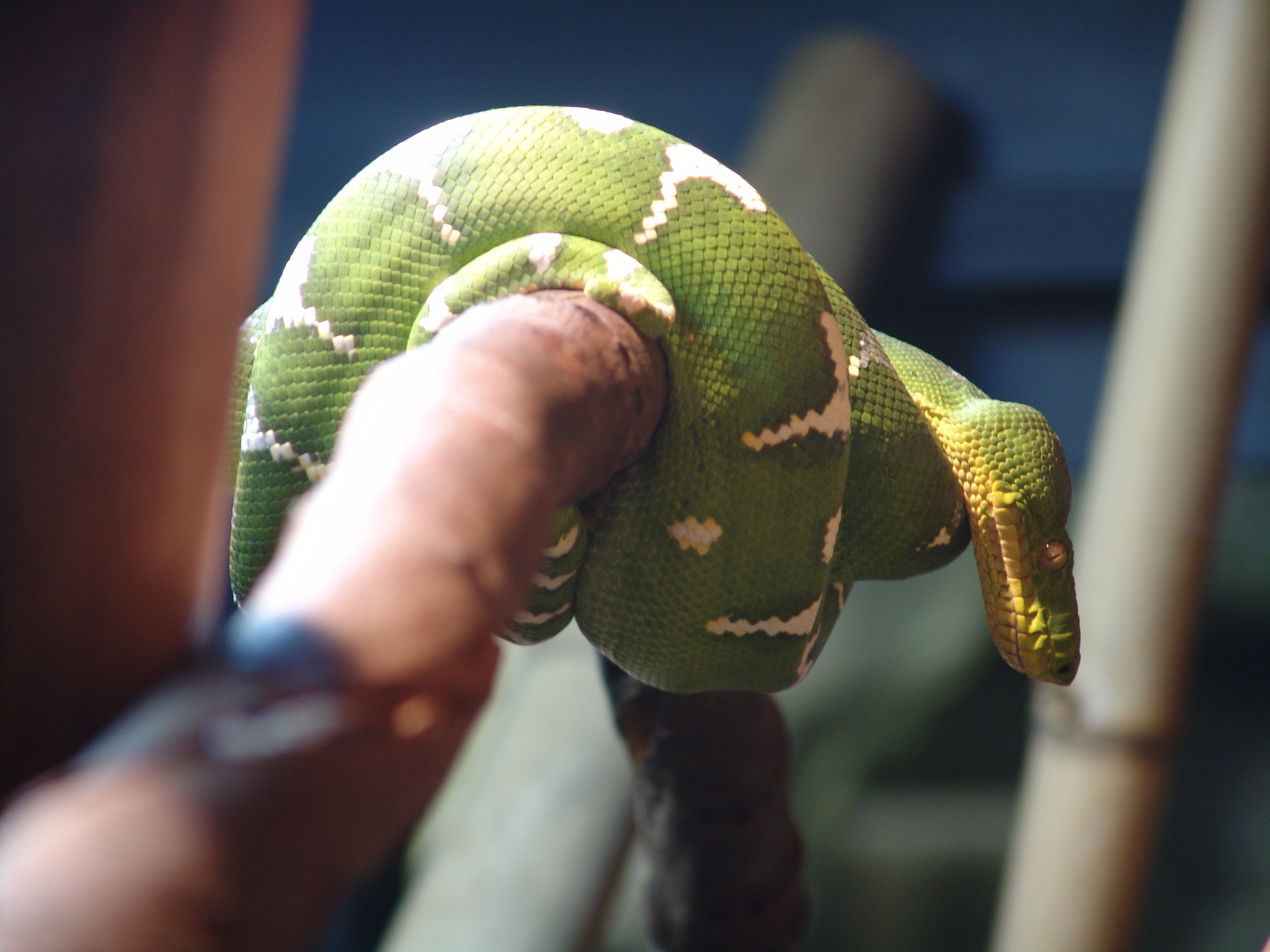
Emerald tree boa

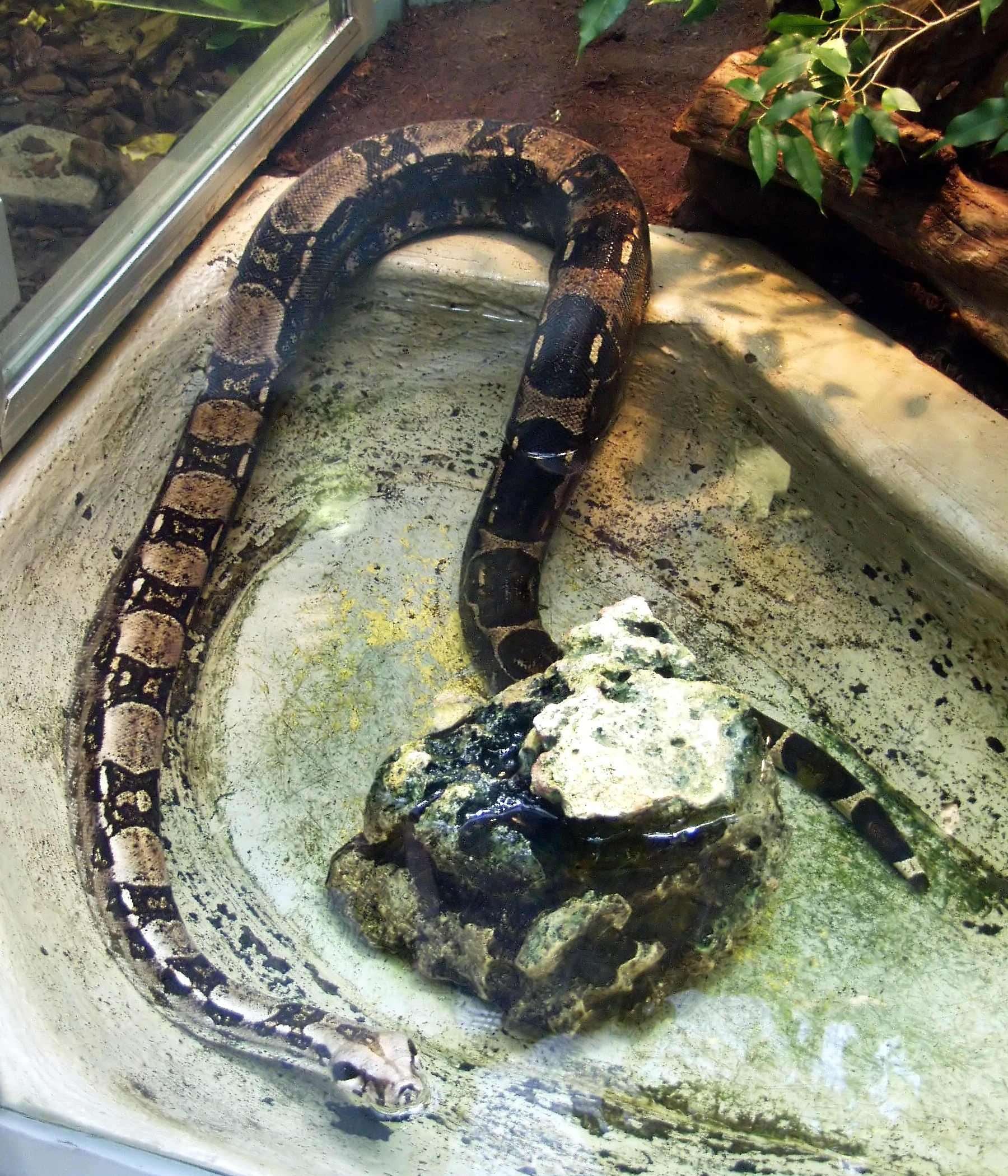
Boa constrictor

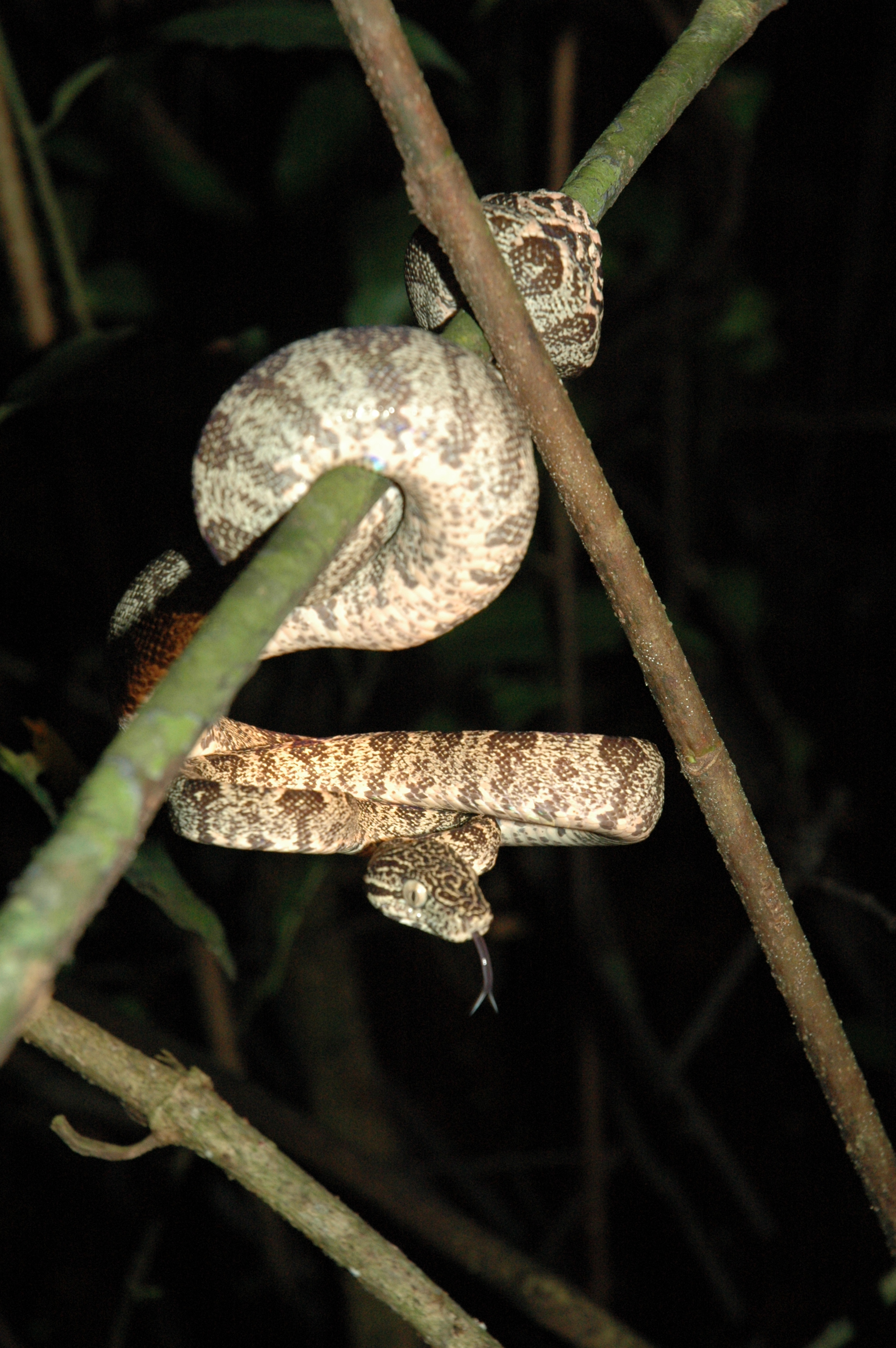
Amazon tree boa

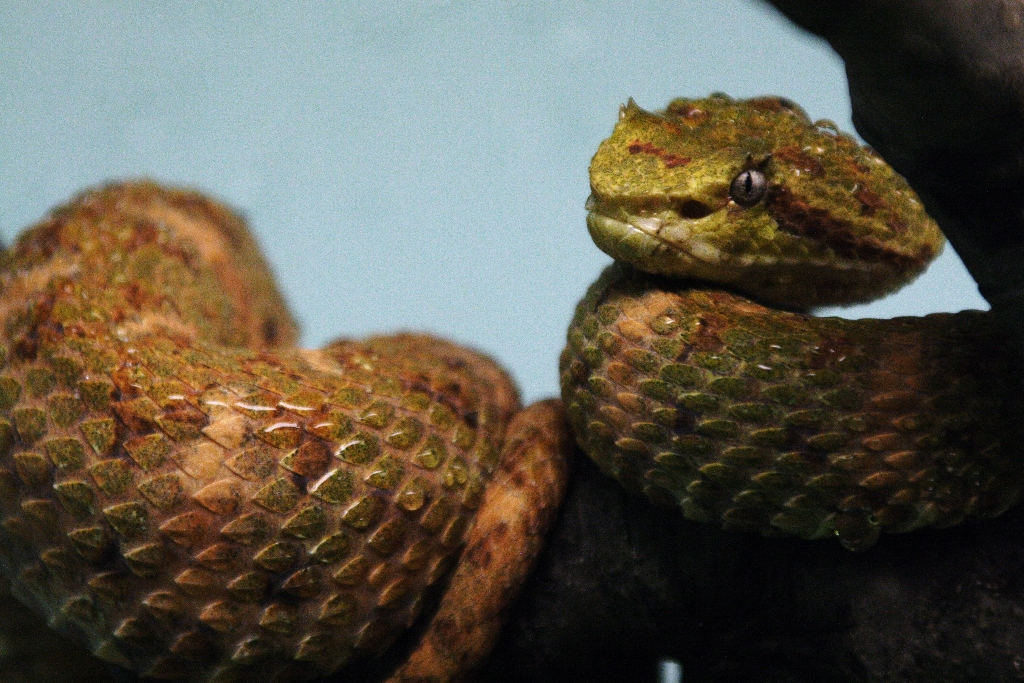
Bothriechis schlegelii

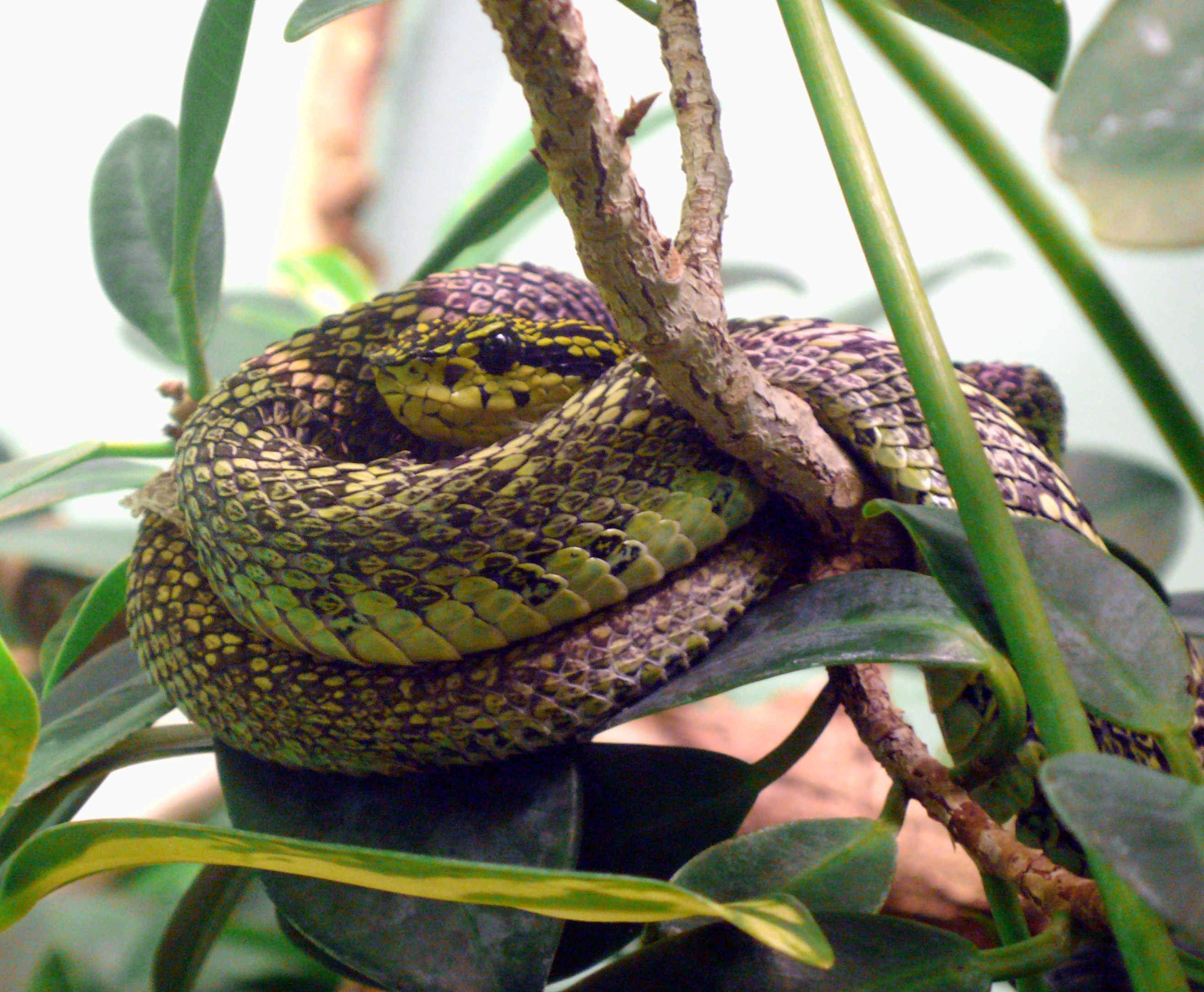
Bothriechis nigroviridis

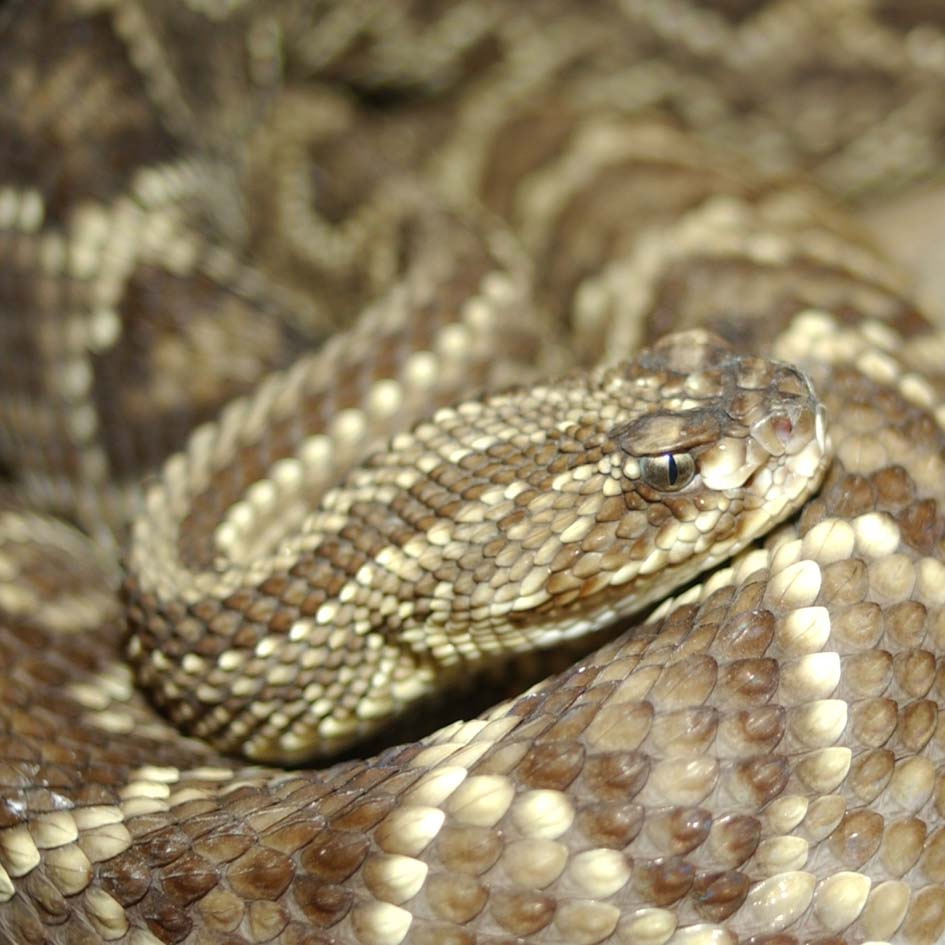
Crotalus durissus

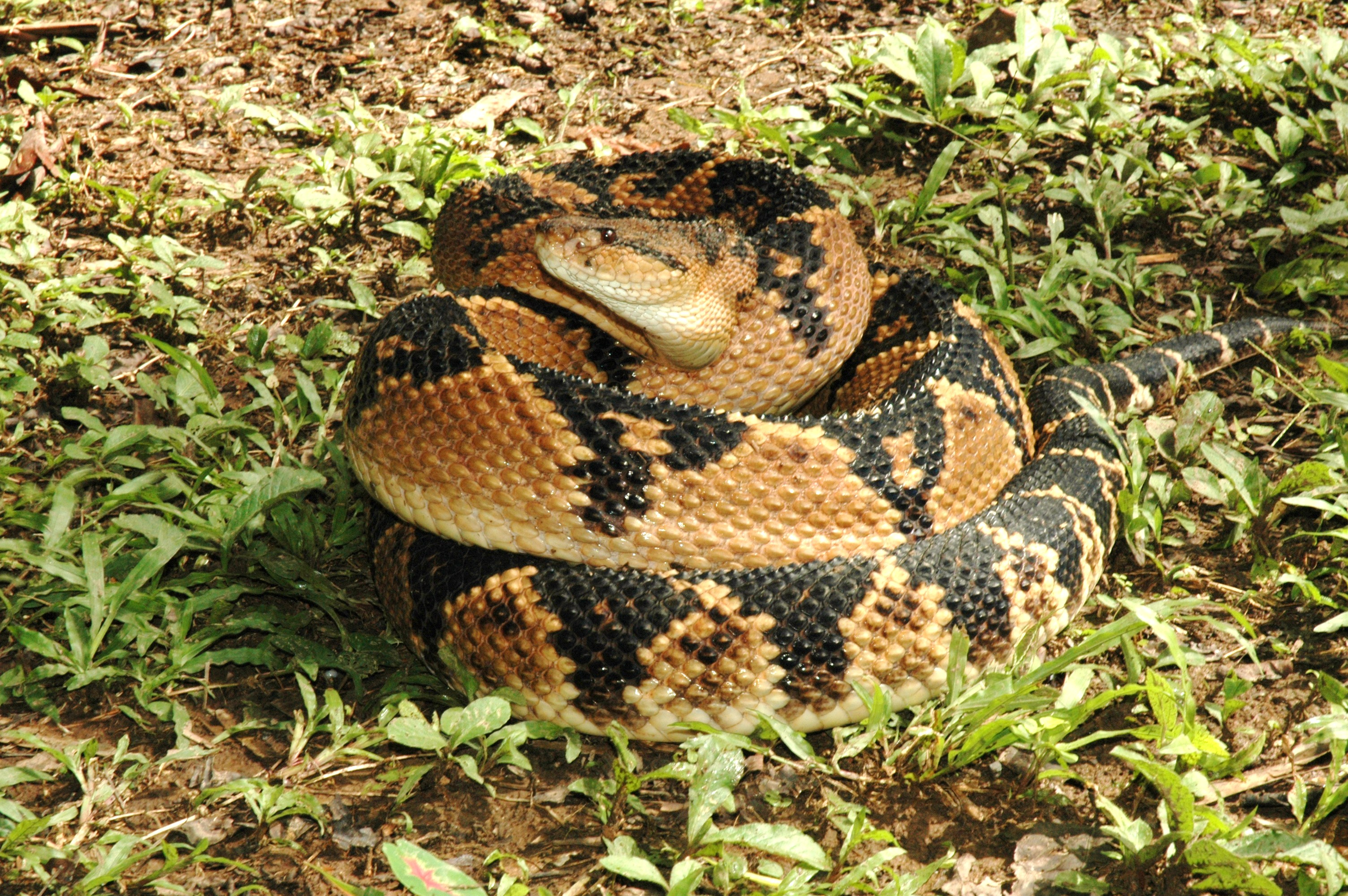
Lachesis muta

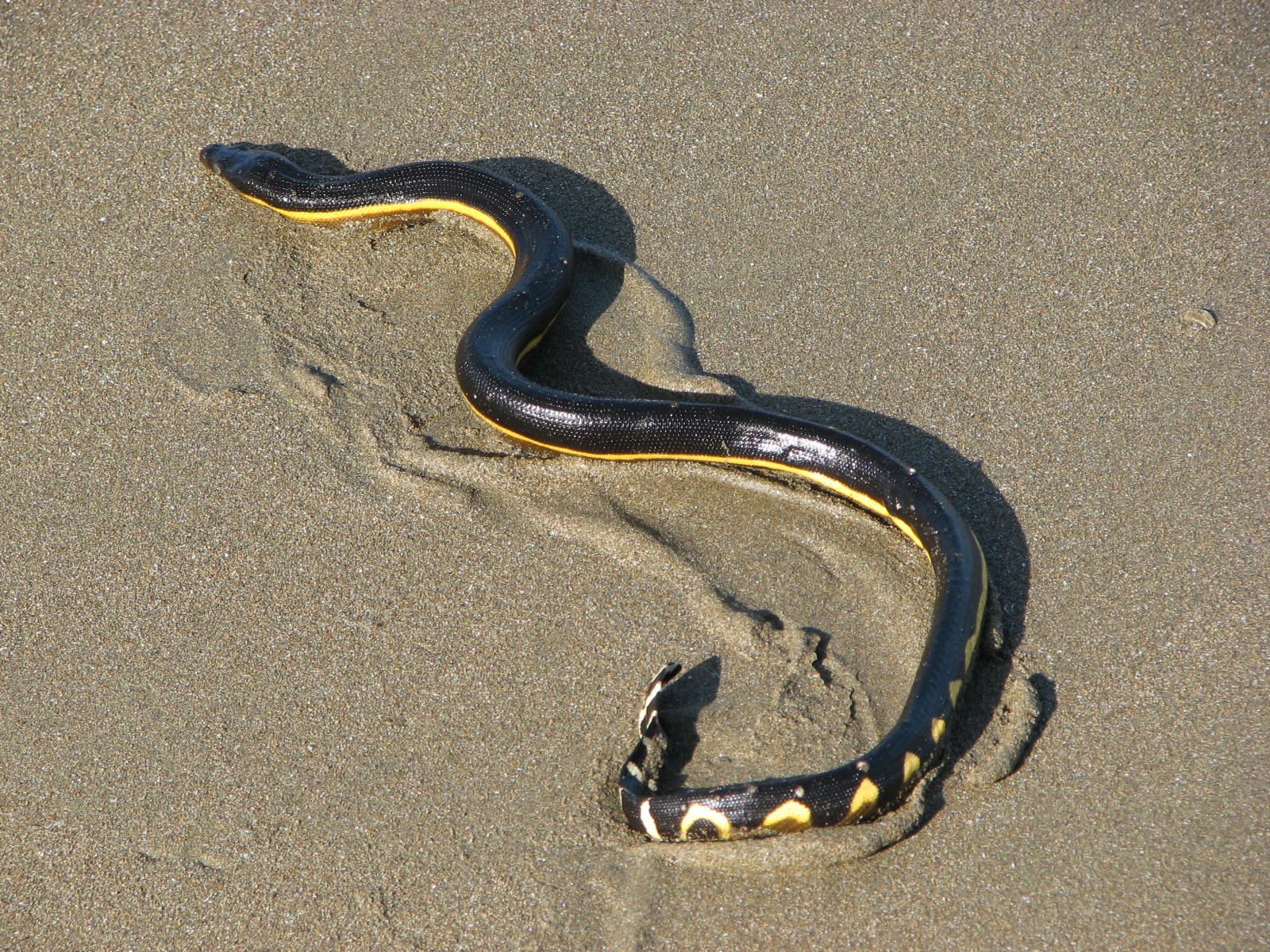
Pelamis platurus, pelagic sea snake

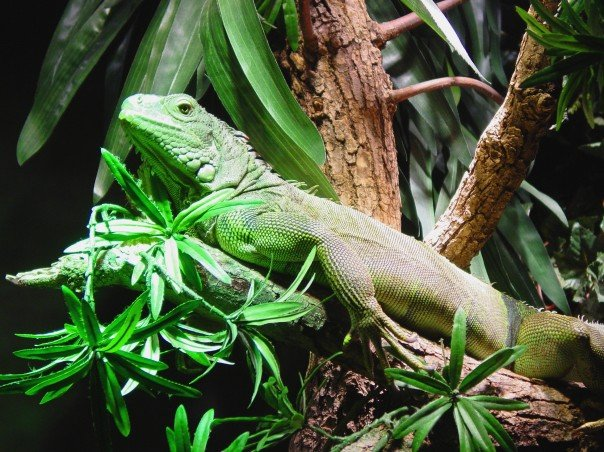
Green iguana

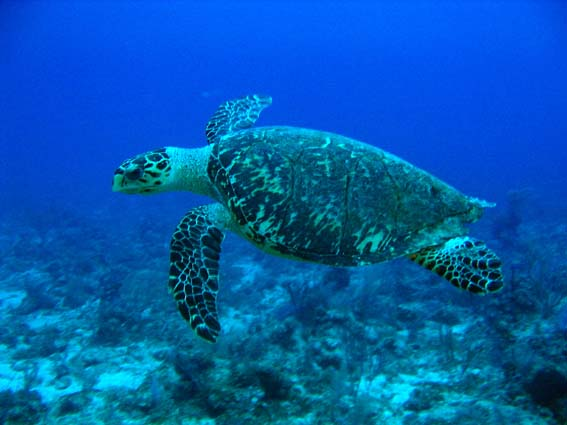
Hawksbill sea turtle

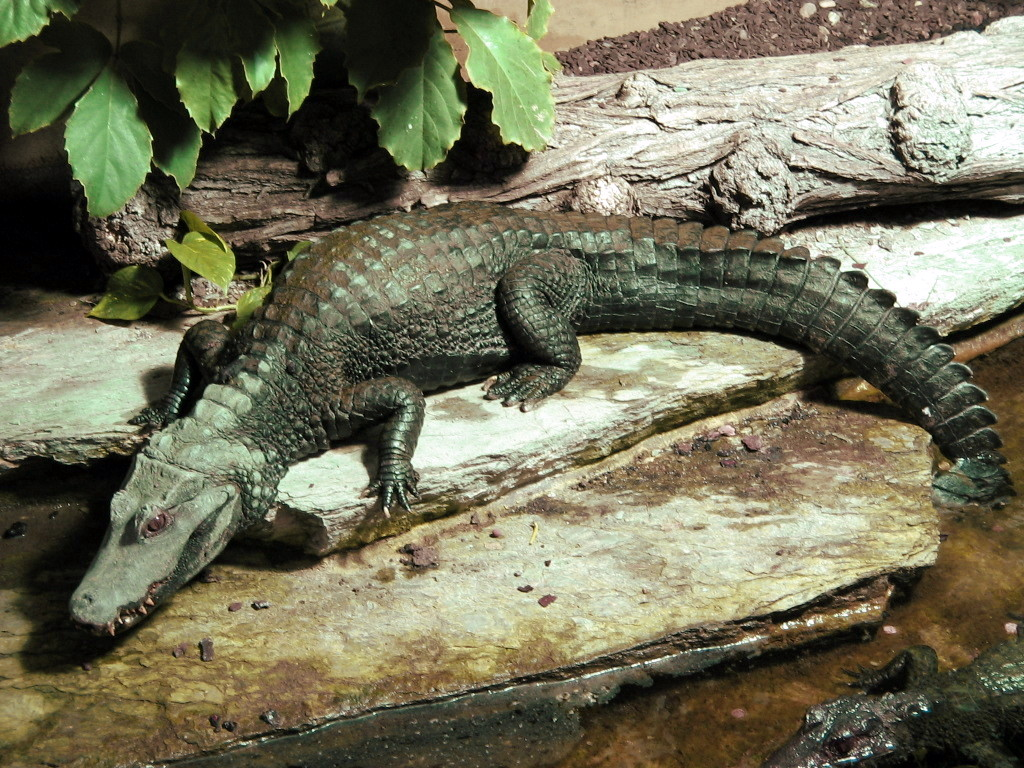
Cuvier's dwarf caiman, Paleosuchus palpebrosus

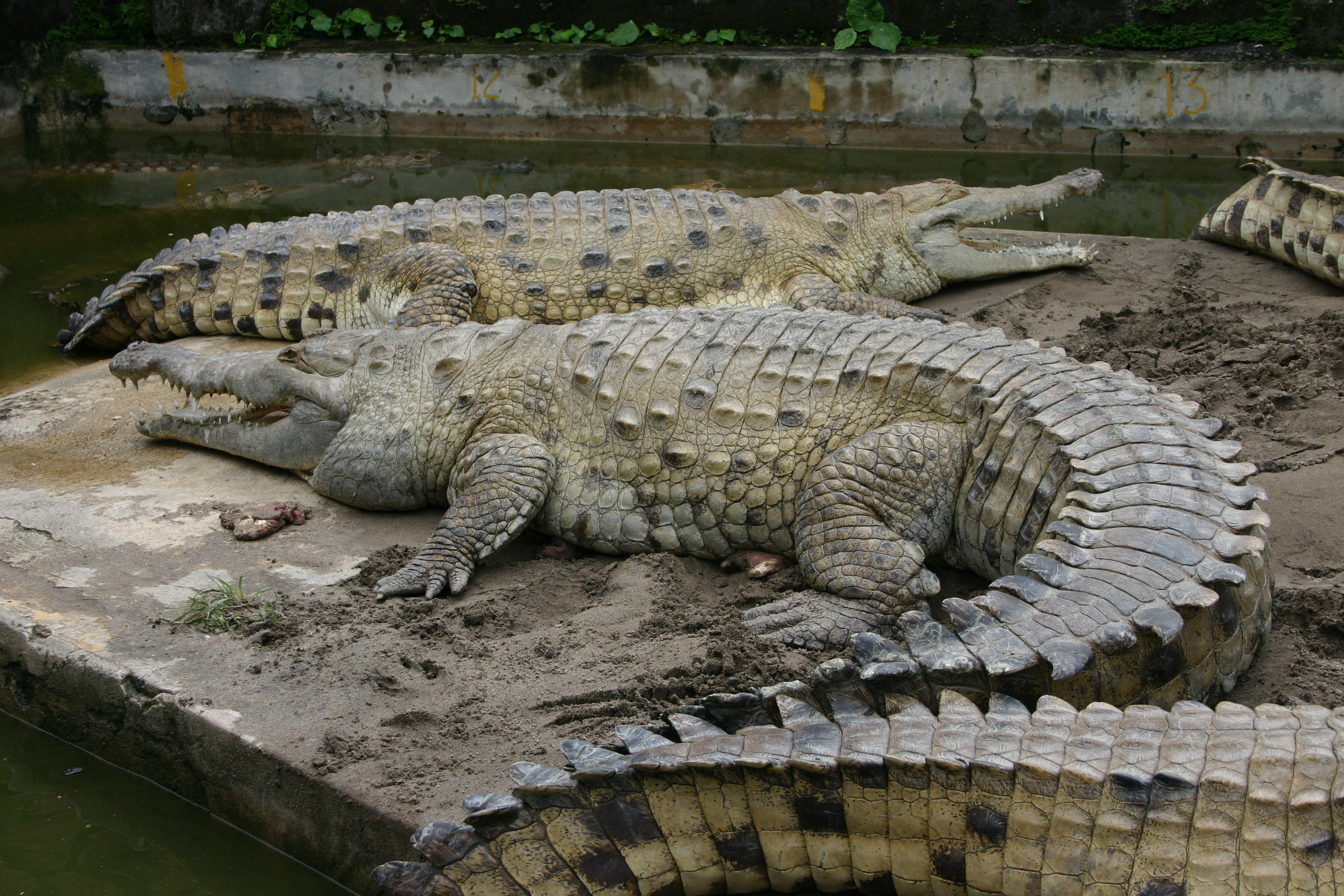
Orinoco crocodile, Crocodylus intermedius

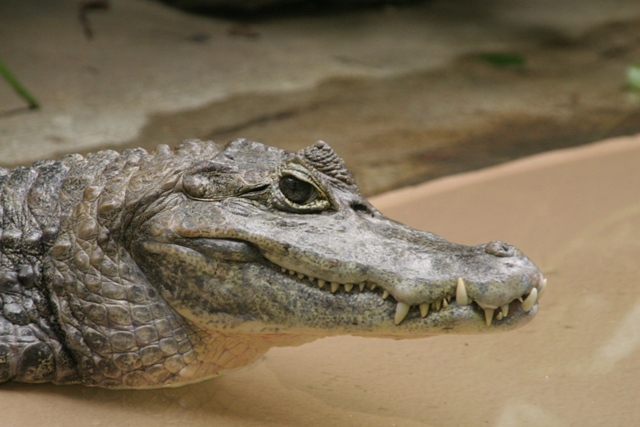
Spectacled caiman, Caiman crocodilus

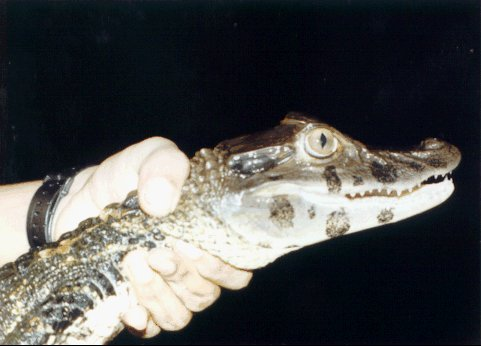
Black caiman, Melanosuchus niger

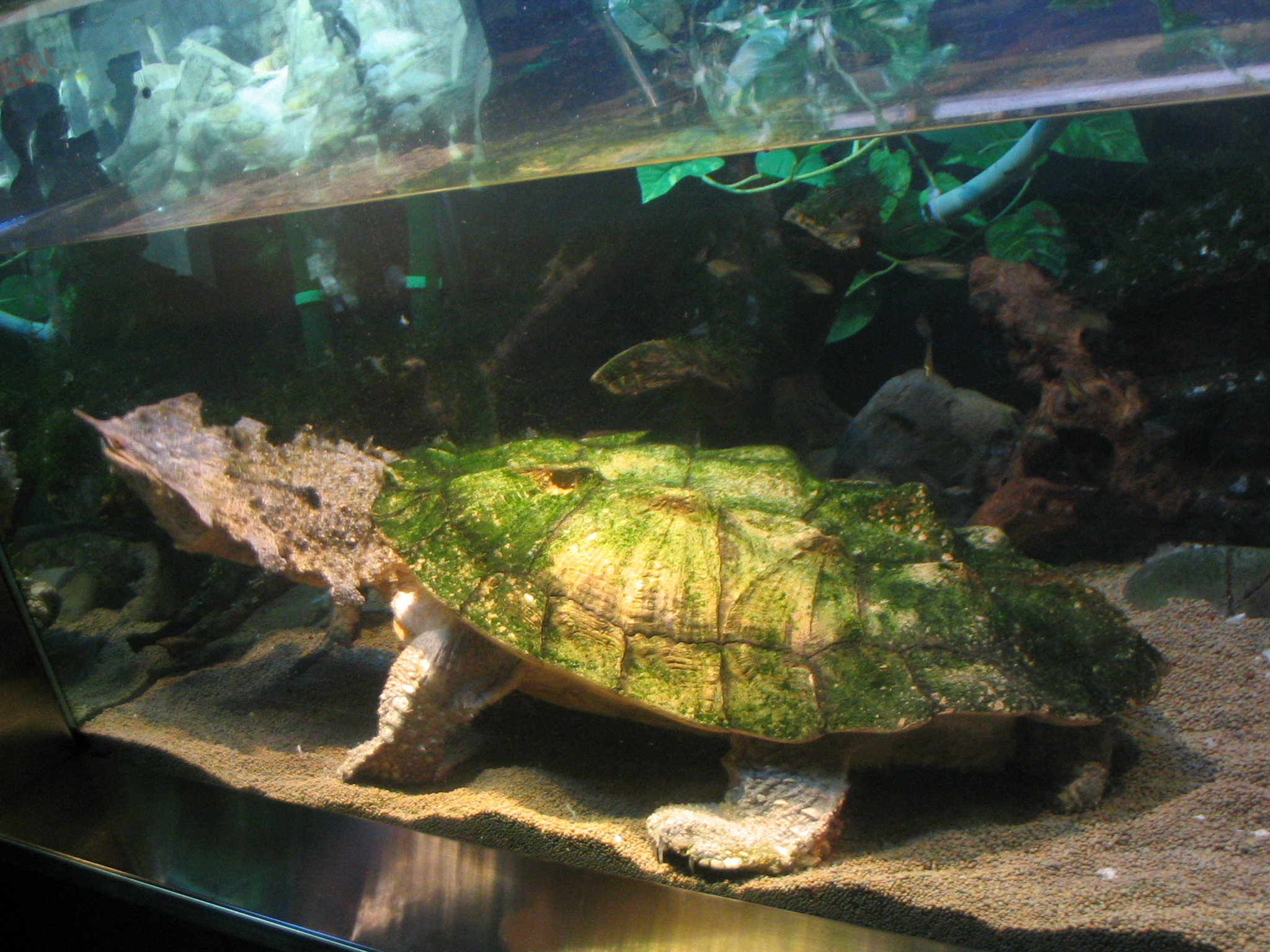
Mata mata, Chelus fimbriatus

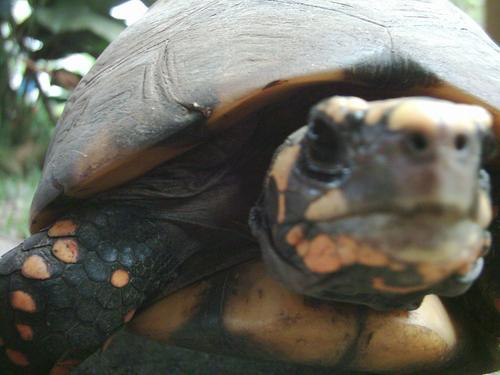
Red-footed tortoise, Geochelone carbonaria

Common snapping turtle, Chelydra serpentina

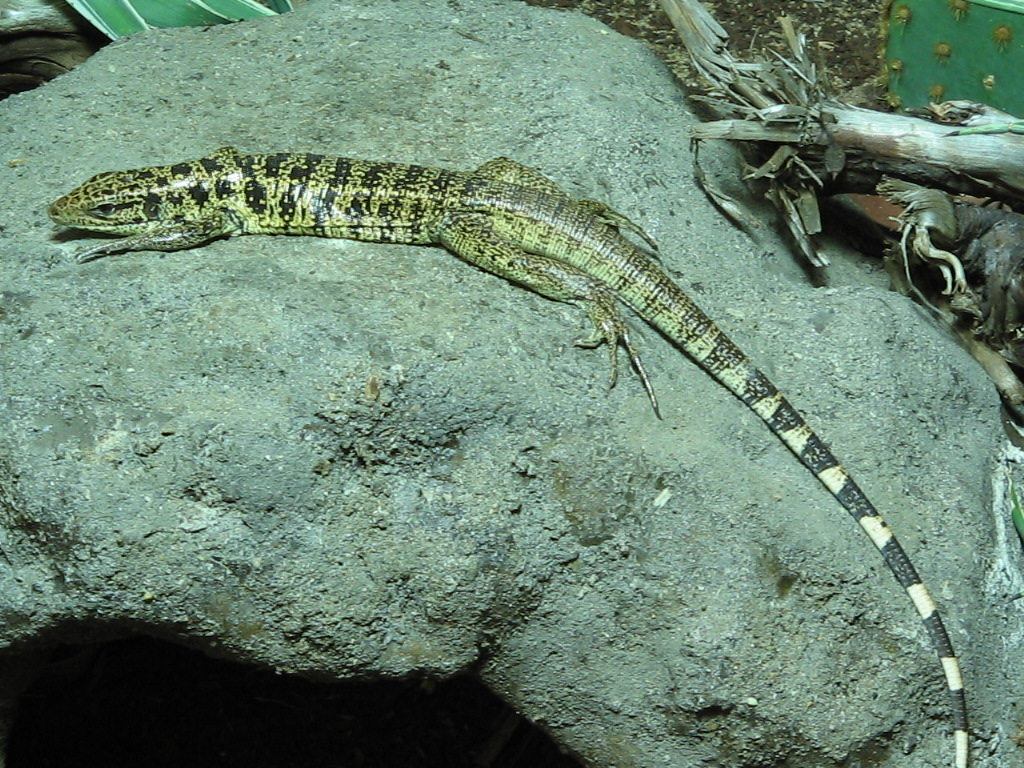
Tupinambis teguixin, gold tegu or Colombian tegu

== Fish ==
Colombia has high fish diversity, with a 2017 estimate suggesting 1,494 species of freshwater fishes. Following a rapid inventory of the Bajo Caguán-Caquetá region in 2019, there are 513 known species in the Caquetá river and 148 known species in the Caguán. During this inventory eight species were identified as possibly new to science.

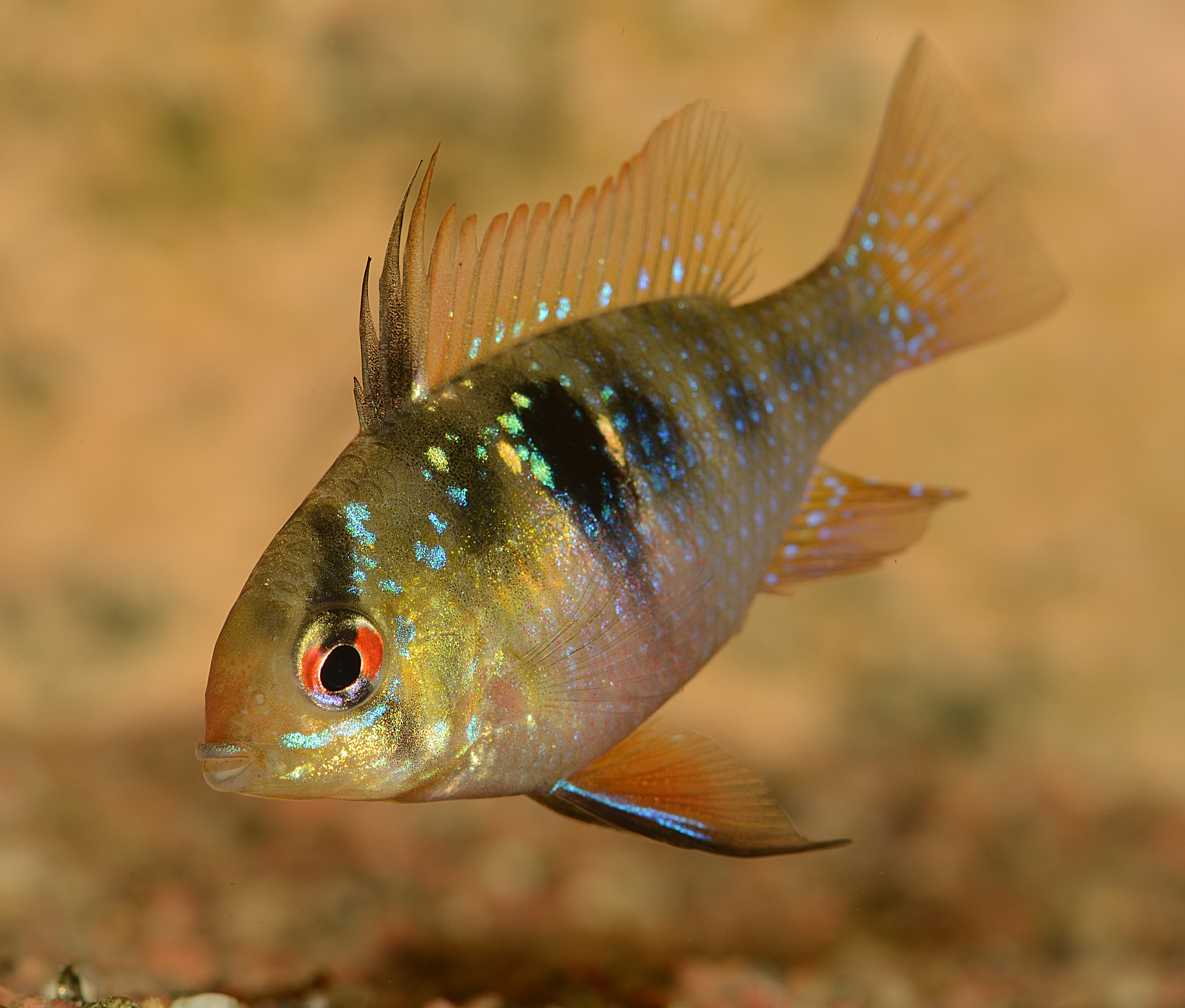
Ram cichlid, Mikrogeophagus ramirezi

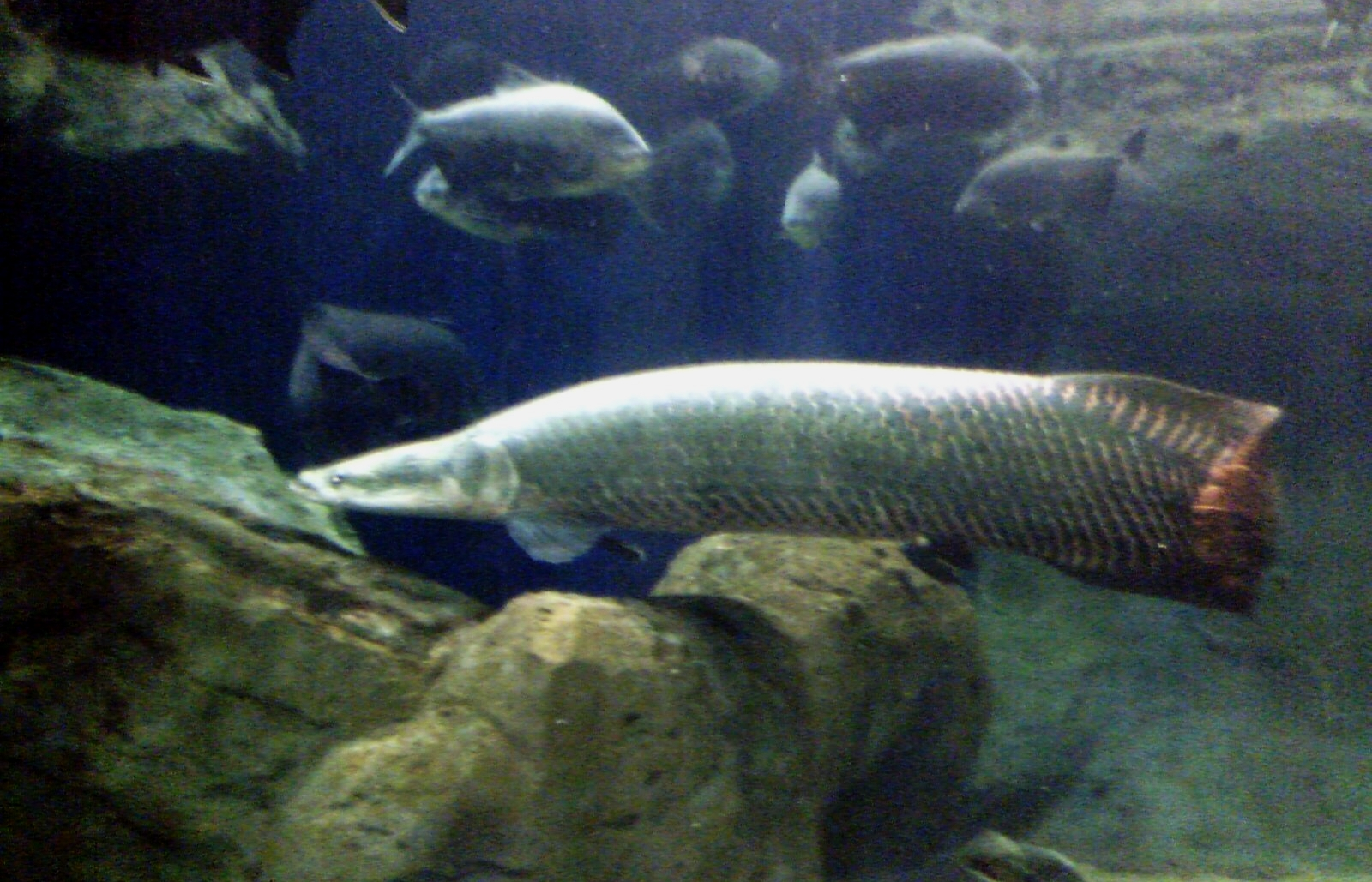
Pirarucu, (Arapaima gigas) is the largest fresh-water fish in the world.

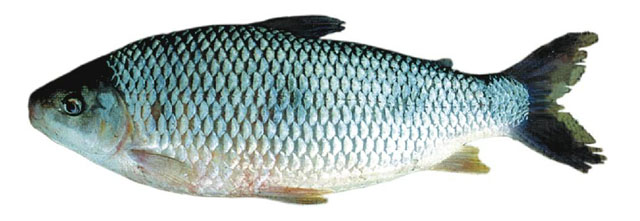
Leporinus obtusidens

== Molluscs ==
There are more than 80 genera of land gastropods in (continental) Colombia.

== Insects ==
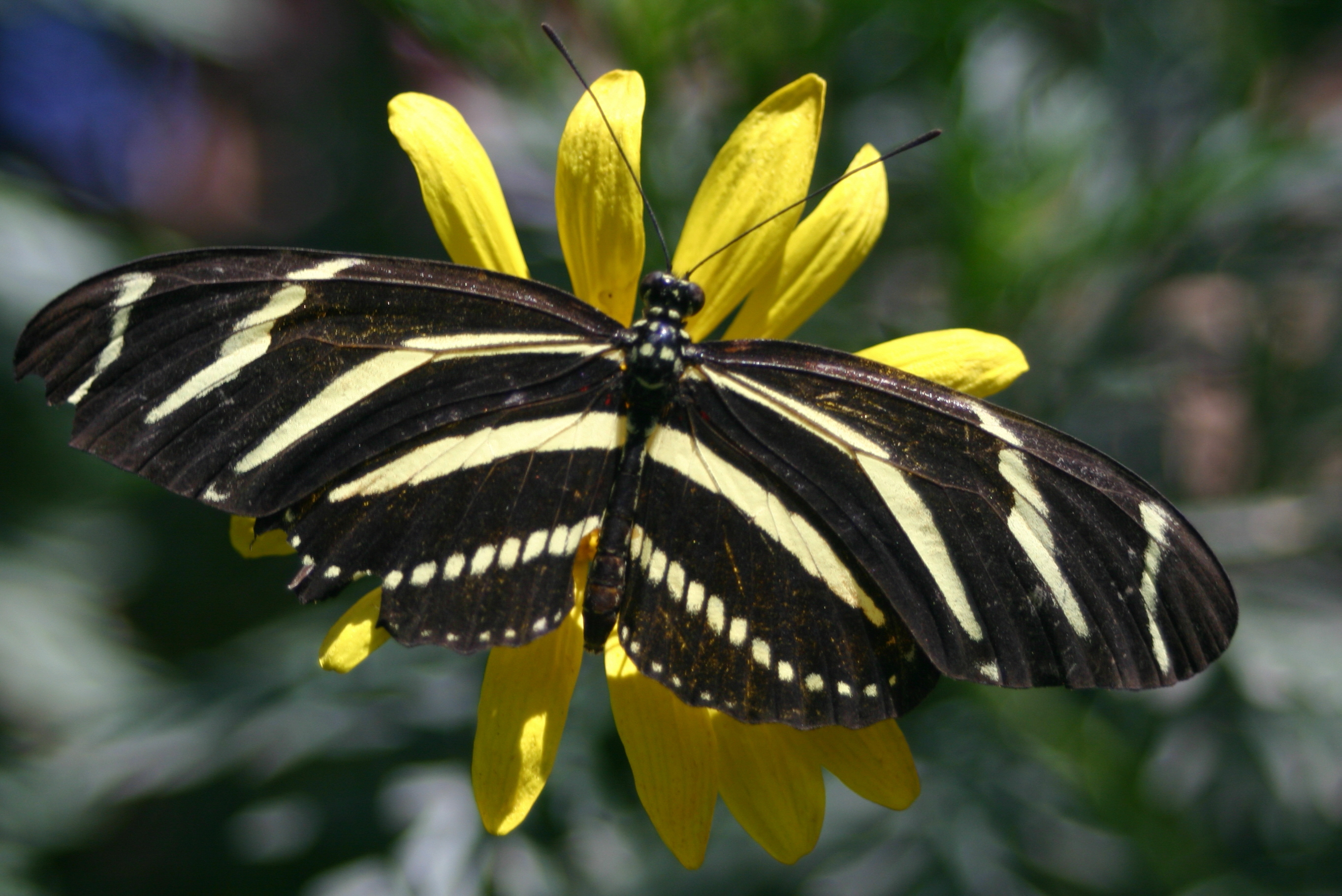
Heliconius charithonia

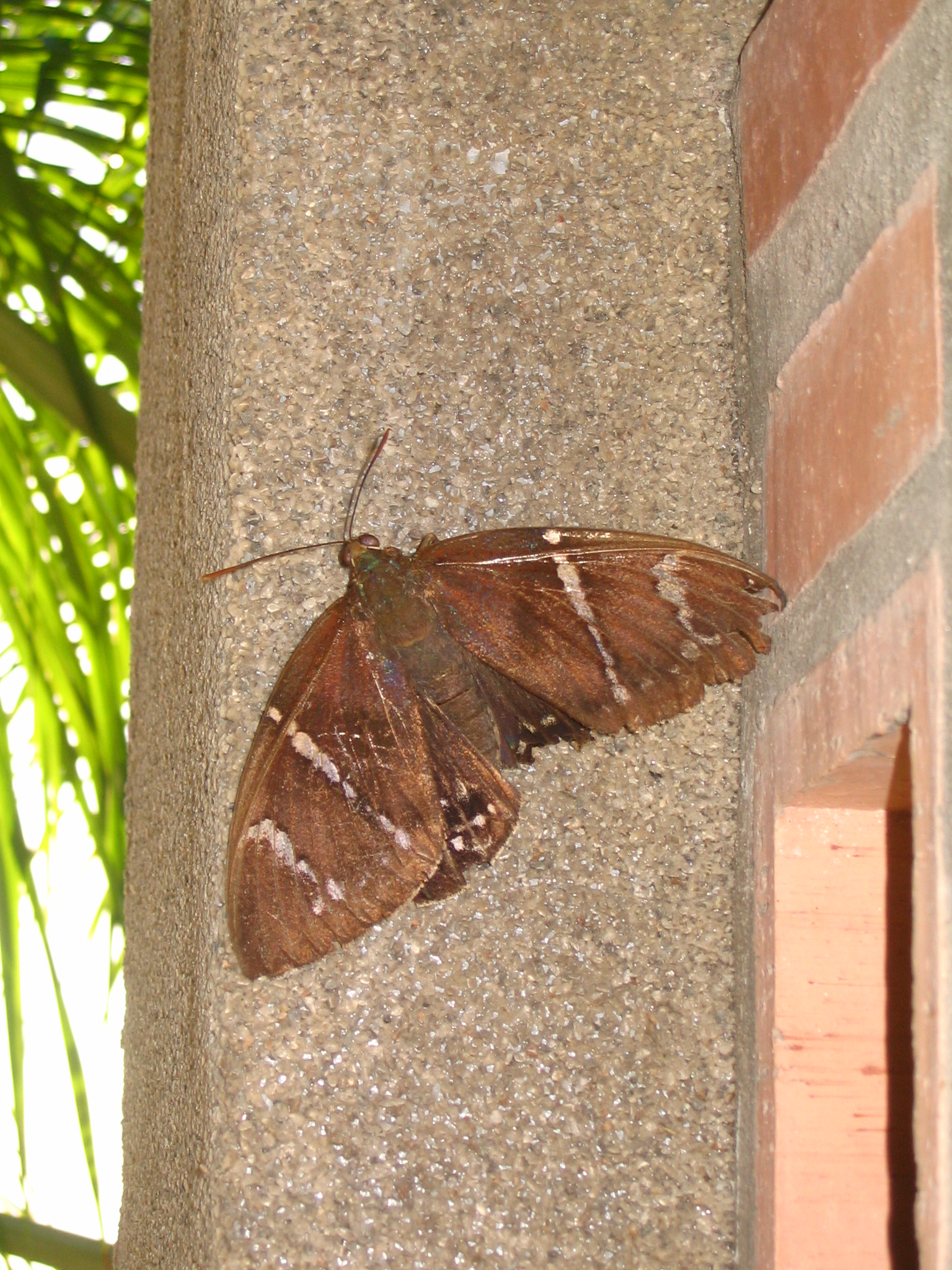
Eupalamides guyanensis

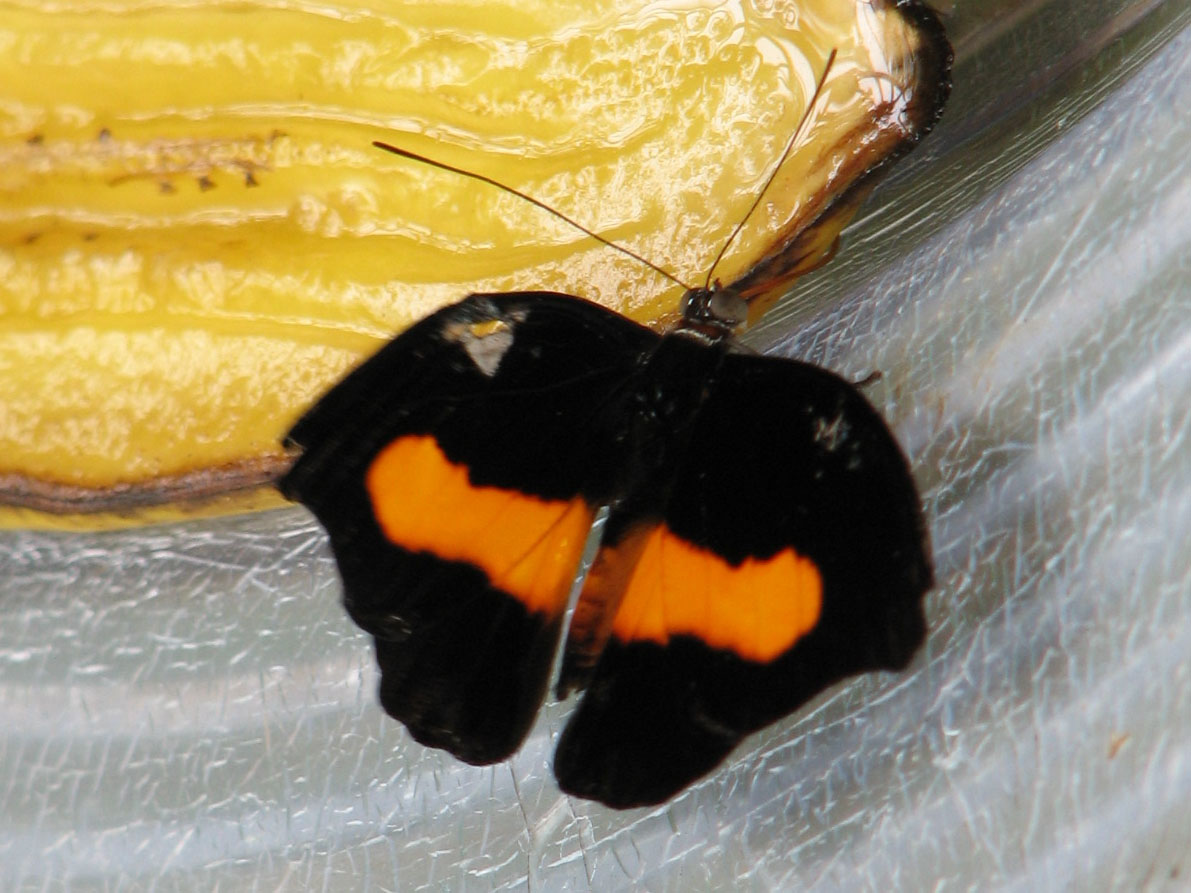
Catonephele orites

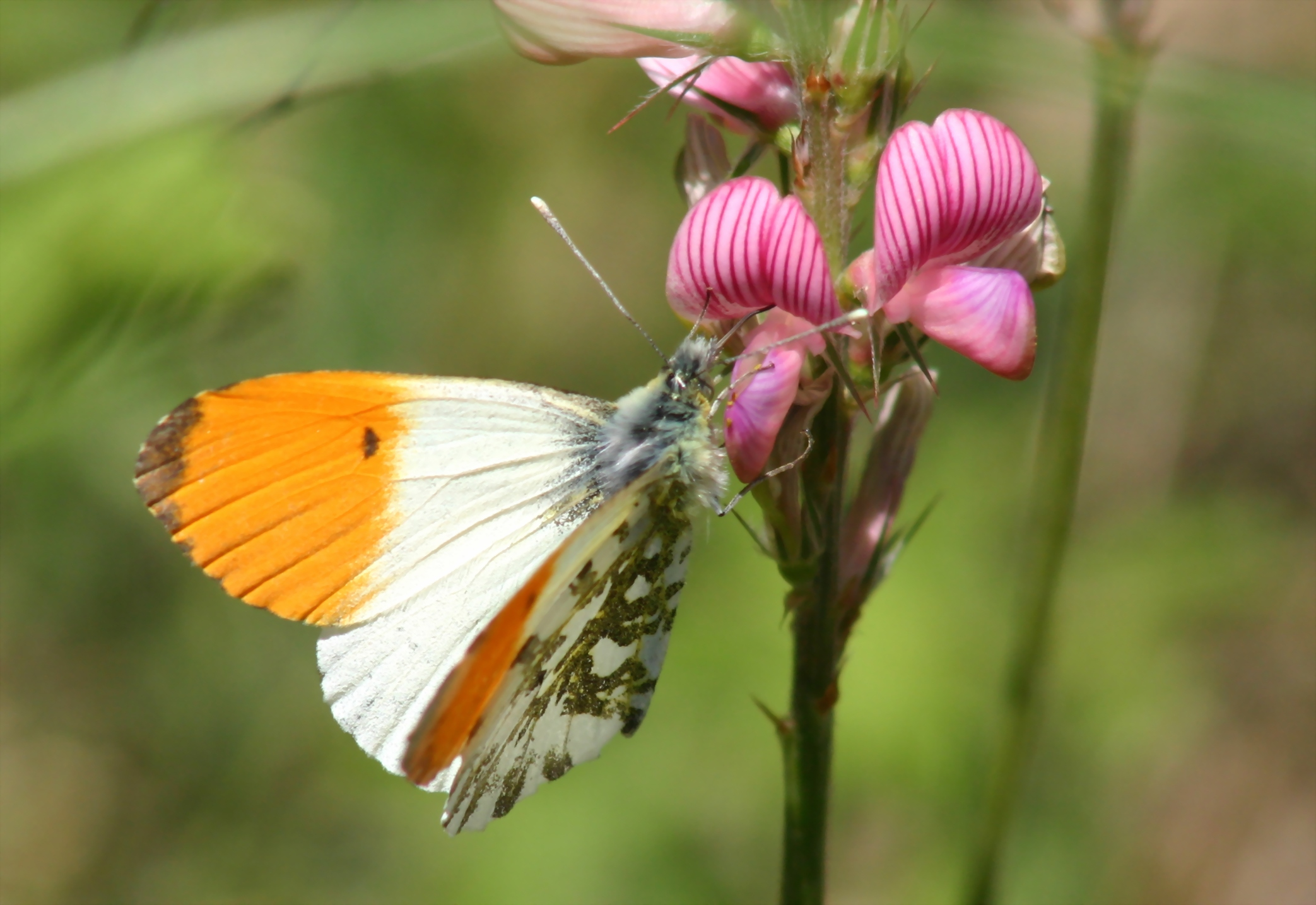
Catalina orangetip

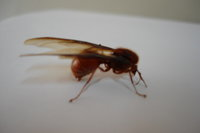
Atta laevigata, edible Hormiga Culona Santandereana (see also Colombian cuisine)

== See also ==
- List of invasive species in Colombia
- Animal rights in Colombia
- Flora of Colombia
- List of national parks of Colombia
