= List of birds of Piauí =

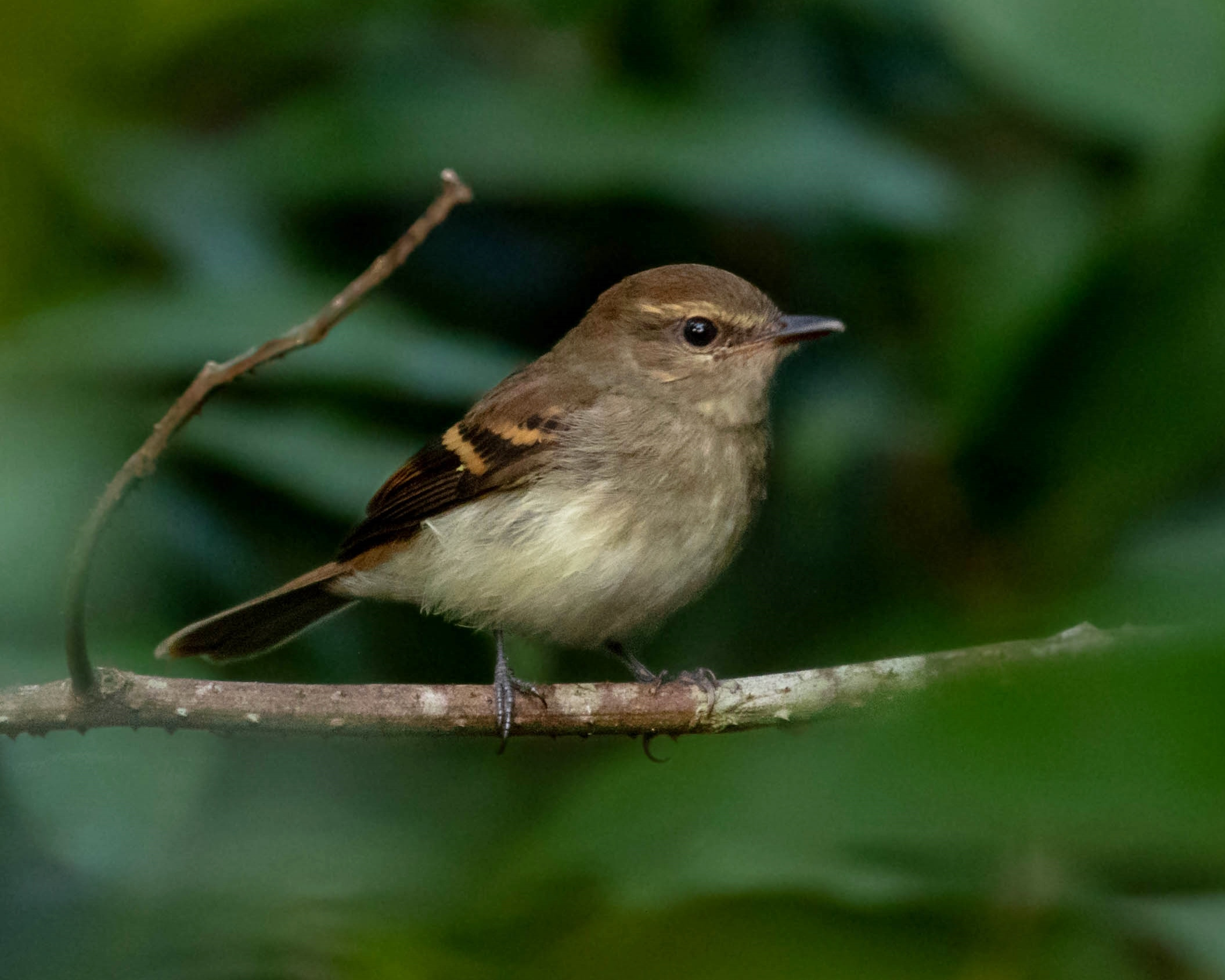
Fuscous flycatcher

This list of birds of Piauí includes species documented in the Brazilian state of Piauí. The backbone of this list is provided by Avibase, and all additions that differ from this list have citations. As of September 2025, there are 607 recorded bird species in Piauí.

The following tags note species in each of those categories:

- (A) Accidental - species not regularly occurring in Piauí
- (Ex) Extirpated - species that no longer occurs in Piauí but still occurs elsewhere
- (EW) Extinct in the wild - species that now only occurs in captivity
- (EB) Endemic to Brazil - species that is only found in Brazil
- (I) Introduced - species that is not native to Piauí

== Rheas ==
Order: Rheiformes Family: Rheidae

- Greater rhea (Rhea americana)

== Tinamous ==
Order: Tinamiformes Family: Tinamidae

- Little tinamou (Crypturellus soui)
- Undulated tinamou (Crypturellus undulatus)
- Yellow-legged tinamou (Crypturellus noctivagus) (EB)
- Small-billed tinamou (Crypturellus parvirostris)
- Tataupa tinamou (Crypturellus tataupa)
- Red-winged tinamou (Rhynchotus rufescens)
- White-bellied nothura (Nothura boraquira)
- Spotted nothura (Nothura maculosa)

== Screamers ==
Order: Anseriformes Family: Anhimidae

- Horned screamer (Anhima cornuta)

== Ducks, geese, and waterfowl ==
Order: Anseriformes Family: Anatidae

- Fulvous whistling duck (Dendrocygna bicolor)
- White-faced whistling duck (Dendrocygna viduata)
- Black-bellied whistling duck (Dendrocygna autumnalis)
- Muscovy duck (Cairina moschata)
- Comb duck (Sarkidiornis sylvicola)
- Brazilian teal (Amazonetta brasiliensis)
- White-cheeked pintail (Anas bahamensis)
- Southern pochard (Netta erythrophthalma)
- Masked duck (Nomonyx dominicus)

== Chachalacas, guans, and curassows ==
Order: Galliformes Family: Cracidae

- Buff-browed chachalaca (Ortalis superciliaris) (EB)
- Rusty-margined guan (Penelope superciliaris)
- White-browed guan (Penelope jacucaca) (EB)

== Doves and pigeons ==
Order: Columbiformes Family: Columbidae

- Rock pigeon (Columba livia) (I)
- Pale-vented pigeon (Patagioenas cayennensis)
- Ruddy pigeon (Patagioenas subvinacea) (A)
- Picazuro pigeon (Patagioenas picazuro)
- White-tipped dove (Leptotila verreauxi)
- Grey-fronted dove (Leptotila rufaxilla)
- Eared dove (Zenaida auriculata)
- Blue ground dove (Claravis pretiosa)
- Long-tailed ground dove (Uropelia campestris)
- Common ground dove (Columbina passerina)
- Plain-breasted ground dove (Columbina minuta)
- Ruddy ground dove (Columbina talpacoti)
- Scaled dove (Columbina squammata)
- Picui ground dove (Columbina picui)

== Cuckoos ==
Order: Cuculiformes Family: Cuculidae

- Guira cuckoo (Guira guira)
- Greater ani (Crotophaga major)
- Smooth-billed ani (Crotophaga ani)
- Striped cuckoo (Tapera naevia)
- Pheasant cuckoo (Dromococcyx phasianellus)
- Pavonine cuckoo (Dromococcyx pavoninus)
- Little cuckoo (Coccycua minuta) (A)
- Squirrel cuckoo (Piaya cayana)
- Dark-billed cuckoo (Coccyzus melacoryphus)
- Yellow-billed cuckoo (Coccyzus americanus)
- Pearly-breasted cuckoo (Coccyzus euleri)
- Mangrove cuckoo (Coccyzus minor)

== Nightjars ==
Order: Caprimulgiformes Family: Caprimulgidae

- Rufous nightjar (Antrostomus rufus)
- Short-tailed nighthawk (Lurocalis semitorquatus)
- Band-tailed nighthawk (Nyctiprogne leucopyga)
- Common pauraque (Nyctidromus albicollis)
- Pygmy nightjar (Nyctipolus hirundinaceus) (EB)
- Little nightjar (Setopagis parvula)
- Band-winged nightjar (Systellura longirostris)
- Spot-tailed nightjar (Hydropsalis maculicaudus) (A)
- Scissor-tailed nightjar (Hydropsalis torquata)
- Least nighthawk (Chordeiles pusillus)
- Nacunda nighthawk (Chordeiles nacunda)
- Lesser nighthawk (Chordeiles acutipennis)

== Potoos ==
Order: Nyctibiiformes Family: Nyctibiidae

- Great potoo (Nyctibius grandis)
- Common potoo (Nyctibius griseus)

== Swifts ==
Order: Apodiformes Family: Apodidae

- Sooty swift (Cypseloides fumigatus)
- Great dusky swift (Cypseloides senex)
- White-collared swift (Streptoprocne zonaris)
- Biscutate swift (Streptoprocne biscutata)
- Sick's swift (Chaetura meridionalis)
- Short-tailed swift (Chaetura brachyura) (A)
- Fork-tailed palm swift (Tachornis squamata)
- Lesser swallow-tailed swift (Panyptila cayennensis)

== Hummingbirds ==
Order: Apodiformes Family: Trochilidae

- Rufous-breasted hermit (Glaucis hirsutus)
- Broad-tipped hermit (Anopetia gounellei) (EB)
- Cinnamon-throated hermit (Phaethornis nattereri)
- Reddish hermit (Phaethornis ruber)
- Planalto hermit (Phaethornis pretrei)
- Horned sungem (Heliactin bilophus)
- White-tailed goldenthroat (Polytmus guainumbi)
- Ruby-topaz hummingbird (Chrysolampis mosquitus)
- Black-throated mango (Anthracothorax nigricollis)
- Long-billed starthroat (Heliomaster longirostris)
- Stripe-breasted starthroat (Heliomaster squamosus) (EB)
- Amethyst woodstar (Calliphlox amethystina)
- Blue-tailed emerald (Chlorostilbon mellisugus) (A)
- Glittering-bellied emerald (Chlorostilbon lucidus)
- Fork-tailed woodnymph (Thalurania furcata)
- Swallow-tailed hummingbird (Eupetomena macroura)
- Versicolored emerald (Chrysuronia versicolor)
- Plain-bellied emerald (Chrysuronia leucogaster)
- Glittering-throated emerald (Chionomesa fimbriata)
- Blue-chinned sapphire (Chlorestes notata)

== Rails ==
Order: Gruiformes Family: Rallidae

- Clapper rail (Rallus longirostris)
- Purple gallinule (Porphyrio martinica)
- Common gallinule (Gallinula galeata)
- Yellow-breasted crake (Laterallus flaviventer)
- Russet-crowned crake (Rufirallus viridis)
- Rufous-sided crake (Laterallus melanophaius)
- Grey-breasted crake (Laterallus exilis)
- Ash-throated crake (Mustelirallus albicollis)
- Paint-billed crake (Neocrex erythrops)
- Spotted rail (Pardirallus maculatus)
- Uniform crake (Amaurolimnas concolor)
- Giant wood rail (Aramides ypecaha) (A)
- Little wood rail (Aramides mangle) (EB)
- Grey-necked wood rail (Aramides cajaneus)

== Sungrebes ==
Order: Gruiformes Family: Heliornithidae

- Sungrebe (Heliornis fulica)

== Limpkins ==
Order: Gruiformes Family: Aramidae

- Limpkin (Aramus guarauna)

== Stilts and avocets ==
Order: Charadriiformes Family: Recurvirostridae

- Black-necked stilt (Himantopus mexicanus)

== Oystercatchers ==
Order: Charadriiformes Family: Haematopodidae

- American oystercatcher (Haematopus palliatus)

== Plovers and lapwings ==
Order: Charadriiformes Family: Charadriidae

- American golden plover (Pluvialis dominica)
- Black-bellied plover (Pluvialis squatarola)
- Pied lapwing (Vanellus cayanus)
- Southern lapwing (Vanellus chilensis)
- Semipalmated plover (Charadrius semipalmatus)
- Wilson's plover (Charadrius wilsonia)
- Collared plover (Charadrius collaris)

== Jacanas ==
Order: Charadriiformes Family: Jacanidae

- Wattled jacana (Jacana jacana)

== Sandpipers ==
Order: Charadriiformes Family: Scolopacidae

- Whimbrel (Numenius phaeopus)
- Ruddy turnstone (Arenaria interpres)
- Red knot (Calidris canutus)
- Stilt sandpiper (Calidris himantopus)
- Sanderling (Calidris alba)
- Least sandpiper (Calidris minutilla)
- White-rumped sandpiper (Calidris fuscicollis)
- Pectoral sandpiper (Calidris melanotos) (A)
- Semipalmated sandpiper (Calidris pusilla)
- Short-billed dowitcher (Limnodromus griseus)
- Pantanal snipe (Gallinago paraguaiae)
- Spotted sandpiper (Actitis macularius)
- Solitary sandpiper (Tringa solitaria)
- Greater yellowlegs (Tringa melanoleuca)
- Lesser yellowlegs (Tringa flavipes)
- Willet (Tringa semipalmata)

== Skuas and jaegers ==
Order: Charadriiformes Family: Stercorariidae

- South polar skua (Stercorarius maccormicki)
- Pomarine jaeger (Stercorarius pomarinus)
- Parasitic jaeger (Stercorarius parasiticus)

== Gulls, terns, and skimmers ==
Order: Charadriiformes Family: Laridae

- Grey-hooded gull (Chroicocephalus cirrocephalus)
- Laughing gull (Leucophaeus atricilla)
- Kelp gull (Larus dominicanus)
- Brown noddy (Anous stolidus)
- Black skimmer (Rynchops niger)
- Least tern (Sternula antillarum)
- Yellow-billed tern (Sternula superciliaris)
- Large-billed tern (Phaetusa simplex)
- Gull-billed tern (Gelochelidon nilotica)
- Common tern (Sterna hirundo)
- Sandwich tern (Thalasseus sandvicensis)
- Royal tern (Thalasseus maximus)

== Flamingos ==
Order: Phoenicopteriformes Family: Phoenicopteridae

- American flamingo (Phoenicopterus ruber) (Ex)

== Grebes ==
Order: Podicipediformes Family: Podicipedidae

- Pied-billed grebe (Podilymbus podiceps)
- Least grebe (Tachybaptus dominicus)

== Sunbitterns ==
Order: Eurypygiformes Family: Eurypygidae

- Sunbittern (Eurypyga helias)

== Southern storm petrels ==
Order: Procellariiformes Family: Oceanitidae

- Wilson's storm-petrel (Oceanites oceanicus)
- Black-bellied storm-petrel (Fregetta tropica)

== Northern storm petrels ==
Order: Procellariiformes Family: Hydrobatidae

- Madeiran storm-petrel (Hydrobates castro) (A)
- Leach's storm-petrel (Hydrobates leucorhous)

== Petrels and shearwaters ==
Order: Procellariiformes Family: Procellariidae

- Cory's shearwater (Calonectris borealis) (A)
- Manx shearwater (Puffinus puffinus)

== Storks ==
Order: Pelecaniformes Family: Ciconiidae

- Jabiru (Jabiru mycteria)
- Wood stork (Mycteria americana)

== Frigatebirds ==
Order: Pelecaniformes Family: Fregatidae

- Magnificent frigatebird (Fregata magnificens)

== Boobies and gannets ==
Order: Pelecaniformes Family: Sulidae

- Masked booby (Sula dactylatra) (A)

== Anhingas ==
Order: Pelecaniformes Family: Anhingidae

- Anhinga (Anhinga anhinga)

== Cormorants ==
Order: Pelecaniformes Family: Phalacrocoracidae

- Neotropic cormorant (Phalacrocorax brasilianus)

== Ibises and spoonbills ==
Order: Pelecaniformes Family: Threskiornithidae

- Roseate spoonbill (Platalea ajaja)
- Scarlet ibis (Eudocimus ruber)
- Green ibis (Mesembrinibis cayennensis)
- Bare-faced ibis (Phimosus infuscatus)
- Buff-necked ibis (Theristicus caudatus)

== Herons and egrets ==
Order: Pelecaniformes Family: Ardeidae

- Rufescent tiger heron (Tigrisoma lineatum)
- Boat-billed heron (Cochlearius cochlearius)
- Zigzag heron (Zebrilus undulatus) (A)
- Pinnated bittern (Botaurus pinnatus)
- Stripe-backed bittern (Botaurus involucris)
- Least bittern (Ixobrychus exilis)
- Black-crowned night heron (Nycticorax nycticorax)
- Yellow-crowned night heron (Nyctanassa violacea)
- Striated heron (Butorides striata)
- Western cattle egret (Ardea ibis)
- Cocoi heron (Ardea cocoi)
- Great egret (Ardea alba)
- Whistling heron (Syrigma sibilatrix)
- Capped heron (Pilherodius pileatus)
- Tricoloured heron (Egretta tricolor)
- Snowy egret (Egretta thula)
- Little blue heron (Egretta caerulea)

== New World vultures ==
Order: Cathartiformes Family: Cathartidae

- Turkey vulture (Cathartes aura)
- Lesser yellow-headed vulture (Cathartes burrovianus)
- King vulture (Sarcoramphus papa)
- Black vulture (Coragyps atratus)

== Ospreys ==
Order: Accipitriformes Family: Pandionidae

- Osprey (Pandion haliaetus)

== Hawks, kites, and eagles ==
Order: Accipitriformes Family: Accipitridae

- White-tailed kite (Elanus leucurus)
- Pearl kite (Gampsonyx swainsonii)
- Hook-billed kite (Chondrohierax uncinatus)
- Grey-headed kite (Leptodon cayanensis)
- Swallow-tailed kite (Elanoides forficatus)
- Snail kite (Rostrhamus sociabilis)
- Rufous-thighed kite (Harpagus diodon)
- Plumbeous kite (Ictinia plumbea)
- Sharp-shinned hawk (Accipiter striatus)
- Bicoloured hawk (Astur bicolor)
- Tiny hawk (Microspizias superciliosus)
- Crane hawk (Geranospiza caerulescens)
- Black-collared hawk (Busarellus nigricollis)
- Savanna hawk (Buteogallus meridionalis)
- Rufous crab hawk (Buteogallus aequinoctialis)
- Great black hawk (Buteogallus urubitinga)
- Chaco eagle (Buteogallus coronatus)
- Roadside hawk (Rupornis magnirostris)
- Harris's hawk (Parabuteo unicinctus)
- White-tailed hawk (Geranoaetus albicaudatus)
- Black-chested buzzard-eagle (Geranoaetus melanoleucus)
- Black hawk eagle (Spizaetus tyrannus)
- Black-and-white hawk eagle (Spizaetus melanoleucus)
- Ornate hawk eagle (Spizaetus ornatus)
- Grey-lined hawk (Buteo nitidus)
- Short-tailed hawk (Buteo brachyurus)
- Zone-tailed hawk (Buteo albonotatus)

== Barn owls ==
Order: Strigiformes Family: Tytonidae

- American barn owl (Tyto furcata)

== Owls ==
Order: Strigiformes Family: Strigidae

- Tropical screech owl (Megascops choliba)
- Spectacled owl (Pulsatrix perspicillata)
- Great horned owl (Bubo virginianus)
- Black-banded owl (Strix huhula)
- Striped owl (Asio clamator)
- Ferruginous pygmy owl (Glaucidium brasilianum)
- Burrowing owl (Athene cunicularia)
- Short-eared owl (Asio flammeus)
- Buff-fronted owl (Aegolius harrisii)

== Trogons ==
Order: Trogoniformes Family: Trogonidae

- Blue-crowned trogon (Trogon curucui)

== Motmots ==
Order: Coraciiformes Family: Momotidae

- Amazonian motmot (Momotus momota)

== Kingfishers ==
Order: Coraciiformes Family: Alcedinidae

- Ringed kingfisher (Megaceryle torquata)
- Amazon kingfisher (Chloroceryle amazona)
- American pygmy kingfisher (Chloroceryle aenea)
- Green kingfisher (Chloroceryle americana)
- Green-and-rufous kingfisher (Chloroceryle inda)

== Puffbirds ==
Order: Piciformes Family: Bucconidae

- Swallow-winged puffbird (Chelidoptera tenebrosa)
- Black-fronted nunbird (Monasa nigrifrons)
- Rusty-breasted nunlet (Nonnula rubecula) (EB)
- Crescent-chested puffbird (Malacoptila striata) (EB)
- Pied puffbird (Notharchus tectus)
- White-necked puffbird (Notharchus hyperrhynchus)
- Spotted puffbird (Bucco tamatia)
- Spot-backed puffbird (Nystalus maculatus)
- White-eared puffbird (Nystalus chacuru)

== Jacamars ==
Order: Piciformes Family: Galbulidae

- Rufous-tailed jacamar (Galbula ruficauda)

== Toucans ==
Order: Piciformes Family: Ramphastidae

- Channel-billed toucan (Ramphastos vitellinus)
- Toco toucan (Ramphastos toco)
- Lettered aracari (Pteroglossus inscriptus)
- Black-necked aracari (Pteroglossus aracari)

== Woodpeckers and piculets ==
Order: Piciformes Family: Picidae

- Ochraceous piculet (Picumnus limae) (EB)(A)
- Spotted piculet (Picumnus pygmaeus) (EB)
- White-wedged piculet (Picumnus albosquamatus)
- White woodpecker (Melanerpes candidus)
- Red-stained woodpecker (Veniliornis affinis)
- Checkered woodpecker (Veniliornis mixtus)
- Little woodpecker (Veniliornis passerinus)
- Red-necked woodpecker (Campephilus rubricollis)
- Crimson-crested woodpecker (Campephilus melanoleucos)
- Lineated woodpecker (Dryocopus lineatus)
- Cream-coloured woodpecker (Celeus flavus)
- Kaempfer's woodpecker (Celeus obrieni) (EB)
- Ochre-backed woodpecker (Celeus ochraceus) (EB)
- Golden-green woodpecker (Piculus chrysochloros)
- Green-barred woodpecker (Colaptes melanochloros)
- Campo flicker (Colaptes campestris)

== Seriemas ==
Order: Cariamiformes Family: Cariamidae

- Red-legged seriema (Cariama cristata)

== Falcons ==
Order: Falconiformes Family: Falconidae

- Laughing falcon (Herpetotheres cachinnans)
- Barred forest falcon (Micrastur ruficollis)
- Collared forest falcon (Micrastur semitorquatus)
- Crested caracara (Caracara plancus)
- Yellow-headed caracara (Daptrius chimachima)
- American kestrel (Falco sparverius)
- Bat falcon (Falco rufigularis)
- Orange-breasted falcon (Falco deiroleucus)
- Aplomado falcon (Falco femoralis)
- Peregrine falcon (Falco peregrinus)

== Parrots ==
Order: Psittaciformes Family: Psittacidae

- White-winged parakeet (Brotogeris versicolurus) (A)
- Yellow-chevroned parakeet (Brotogeris chiriri)
- Scaly-headed parrot (Pionus maximiliani)
- Blue-headed parrot (Pionus menstruus)
- Yellow-faced parrot (Alipiopsitta xanthops)
- Turquoise-fronted parrot (Amazona aestiva)
- Orange-winged amazon (Amazona amazonica)
- Cobalt-rumped parrotlet (Forpus xanthopterygius)
- Hyacinth macaw (Anodorhynchus hyacinthinus)
- Peach-fronted parakeet (Eupsittula aurea)
- Cactus parakeet (Eupsittula cactorum) (EB)
- Jandaya parakeet (Aratinga jandaya) (EB)
- Spix's macaw (Cyanopsitta spixii) (EB)(EW)
- Red-bellied macaw (Orthopsittaca manilatus)
- Blue-winged macaw (Primolius maracana)
- Blue-and-yellow macaw (Ara ararauna)
- Red-and-green macaw (Ara chloropterus)
- Blue-crowned parakeet (Thectocercus acuticaudatus)
- Red-shouldered macaw (Diopsittaca nobilis)
- White-eyed parakeet (Psittacara leucophthalmus)

== Antbirds ==
Order: Passeriformes Family: Thamnophilidae

- Stripe-backed antbird (Myrmorchilus strigilatus)
- Southern white-fringed antwren (Formicivora grisea)
- Black-bellied antwren (Formicivora melanogaster)
- Rusty-backed antwren (Formicivora rufa)
- Silvery-cheeked antshrike (Sakesphorus cristatus) (EB)
- Plain antvireo (Dysithamnus mentalis)
- Black-capped antwren (Herpsilochmus atricapillus)
- Barred antshrike (Thamnophilus doliatus)
- Rufous-winged antshrike (Thamnophilus torquatus)
- Planalto slaty antshrike (Thamnophilus pelzelni) (EB)
- Amazonian antshrike (Thamnophilus amazonicus) (A)
- Great antshrike (Taraba major)
- Caatinga antwren (Radinopsyche sellowi) (EB)
- East Amazonian fire-eye (Pyriglena leuconota) (EB)

== Crescentchests ==
Order: Passeriformes Family: Melanopareiidae

- Collared crescentchest (Melanopareia torquata)

== Gnateaters ==
Order: Passeriformes Family: Conopophagidae

- Hooded gnateater (Conopophaga roberti) (EB)

== Antpittas ==
Order: Passeriformes Family: Grallariidae

- White-browed antpitta (Hylopezus ochroleucus) (EB)

== Ground antbirds ==
Order: Passeriformes Family: Formicariidae

- Rufous-capped antthrush (Formicarius colma)

== Ovenbirds ==
Order: Passeriformes Family: Furnariidae

- Streaked xenops (Xenops rutilans)
- Amazonian plain xenops (Xenops genibarbis)
- Olivaceous woodcreeper (Sittasomus griseicapillus)
- Planalto woodcreeper (Dendrocolaptes platyrostris)
- Moustached woodcreeper (Xiphocolaptes falcirostris) (EB)
- Buff-throated woodcreeper (Xiphorhynchus guttatus)
- Straight-billed woodcreeper (Dendroplex picus)
- Red-billed scythebill (Campylorhamphus trochilirostris)
- Narrow-billed woodcreeper (Lepidocolaptes angustirostris)
- Scaled woodcreeper (Lepidocolaptes squamatus) (EB)
- Point-tailed palmcreeper (Berlepschia rikeri)
- Wing-banded hornero (Furnarius figulus) (EB)
- Pale-legged hornero (Furnarius leucopus)
- Rufous hornero (Furnarius rufus)
- Great xenops (Megaxenops parnaguae) (EB)
- Rufous-fronted thornbird (Phacellodomus rufifrons)
- Rusty-backed spinetail (Cranioleuca vulpina)
- Grey-headed spinetail (Cranioleuca semicinerea) (EB)
- Caatinga cacholote (Pseudoseisura cristata) (EB)
- Yellow-chinned spinetail (Certhiaxis cinnamomeus)
- Chotoy spinetail (Schoeniophylax phryganophilus)
- Ochre-cheeked spinetail (Synallaxis scutata)
- Red-shouldered spinetail (Synallaxis hellmayri) (EB)
- Pale-breasted spinetail (Synallaxis albescens)
- Sooty-fronted spinetail (Synallaxis frontalis)

== Manakins ==
Order: Passeriformes Family: Pipridae

- Pale-bellied tyrant manakin (Neopelma pallescens)
- Blue-backed manakin (Chiroxiphia pareola)
- Helmeted manakin (Chiroxiphia galeata)
- White-bearded manakin (Manacus manacus) (A)

== Cotingas ==
Order: Passeriformes Family: Cotingidae

- Bearded bellbird (Procnias averano)

== Tityras, mourners, and allies ==
Order: Passeriformes Family: Tityridae

- Black-tailed tityra (Tityra cayana)
- Black-crowned tityra (Tityra inquisitor)
- Green-backed becard (Pachyramphus viridis)
- Cinereous becard (Pachyramphus rufus) (A)
- White-winged becard (Pachyramphus polychopterus)
- Crested becard (Pachyramphus validus)
- White-naped xenopsaris (Xenopsaris albinucha)

== Royal flycatchers and allies ==
Order: Passeriformes Family: Onychorhynchidae

- Black-tailed flycatcher (Myiobius atricaudus)

== Tyrant flycatchers ==
Order: Passeriformes Family: Tyrannidae

- White-throated spadebill (Platyrinchus mystaceus)
- Sepia-capped flycatcher (Leptopogon amaurocephalus)
- Yellow-olive flatbill (Tolmomyias sulphurescens)
- Yellow-breasted flycatcher (Tolmomyias flaviventris)
- Spotted tody flycatcher (Todirostrum maculatum)
- Common tody flycatcher (Todirostrum cinereum)
- Smoky-fronted tody flycatcher (Poecilotriccus fumifrons)
- Stripe-necked tody tyrant (Hemitriccus striaticollis)
- Pearly-vented tody tyrant (Hemitriccus margaritaceiventer)
- Helmeted pygmy-tyrant (Lophotriccus galeatus)
- Cliff flycatcher (Hirundinea ferruginea)
- Guianan tyrannulet (Zimmerius acer)
- Lesser wagtail-tyrant (Stigmatura napensis)
- Greater wagtail-tyrant (Stigmatura budytoides)
- Tawny-crowned pygmy tyrant (Euscarthmus meloryphus)
- Southern beardless tyrannulet (Camptostoma obsoletum)
- Suiriri flycatcher (Suiriri suiriri)
- Yellow-bellied elaenia (Elaenia flavogaster)
- Large elaenia (Elaenia spectabilis)
- Chilean elaenia (Elaenia chilensis)
- Plain-crested elaenia (Elaenia cristata)
- Lesser elaenia (Elaenia chiriquensis)
- Forest elaenia (Myiopagis gaimardii)
- Grey-headed elaenia (Myiopagis caniceps)
- Greenish elaenia (Myiopagis viridicata)
- Yellow tyrannulet (Capsiempis flaveola)
- Southern mouse-colored tyrannulet (Phaeomyias murina)
- Reiser's tyrannulet (Phyllomyias reiseri)
- Planalto tyrannulet (Phyllomyias fasciatus)
- White-crested tyrannulet (Serpophaga subcristata)
- Cinnamon attila (Attila cinnamomeus)
- Bright-rumped attila (Attila spadiceus)
- Piratic flycatcher (Legatus leucophaius)
- Swainson's flycatcher (Myiarchus swainsoni)
- Short-crested flycatcher (Myiarchus ferox)
- Brown-crested flycatcher (Myiarchus tyrannulus)
- Sibilant sirystes (Sirystes sibilator)
- Rufous casiornis (Casiornis rufus)
- Ash-throated casiornis (Casiornis fuscus) (EB)
- Great kiskadee (Pitangus sulphuratus)
- Lesser kiskadee (Philohydor lictor)
- Cattle tyrant (Machetornis rixosa)
- Streaked flycatcher (Myiodynastes maculatus)
- Sulphury flycatcher (Tyrannopsis sulphurea)
- Boat-billed flycatcher (Megarynchus pitangua)
- Rusty-margined flycatcher (Myiozetetes cayanensis)
- Social flycatcher (Myiozetetes similis)
- White-throated kingbird (Tyrannus albogularis)
- Tropical kingbird (Tyrannus melancholicus)
- Fork-tailed flycatcher (Tyrannus savana)
- Crowned slaty flycatcher (Griseotyrannus aurantioatrocristatus)
- Variegated flycatcher (Empidonomus varius)
- Chapada flycatcher (Guyramemua affine)
- Southern scrub flycatcher (Sublegatus modestus)
- Long-tailed tyrant (Colonia colonus)
- White-headed marsh tyrant (Arundinicola leucocephala)
- Black-backed water tyrant (Fluvicola albiventer)
- Masked water tyrant (Fluvicola nengeta)
- Vermilion flycatcher (Pyrocephalus rubinus)
- Bran-colored flycatcher (Myiophobus fasciatus)
- Fuscous flycatcher (Cnemotriccus fuscatus)
- Euler's flycatcher (Lathrotriccus euleri)
- Southern tropical pewee (Contopus cinereus)
- Yellow-browed tyrant (Satrapa icterophrys)
- White monjita (Xolmis irupero)
- Grey monjita (Xolmis cinereus)
- White-rumped monjita (Xolmis velatus)

== Vireos and allies ==
Order: Passeriformes Family: Vireonidae

- Rufous-browed peppershrike (Cyclarhis gujanensis)
- Grey-eyed greenlet (Hylophilus amaurocephalus)
- Ashy-headed greenlet (Hylophilus pectoralis)
- Chivi vireo (Vireo chivi)

== Crows, jays, and allies ==
Order: Passeriformes Family: Corvidae

- Curl-crested jay (Cyanocorax cristatellus)
- White-naped jay (Cyanocorax cyanopogon) (EB)

== Donacobiuses ==
Order: Passeriformes Family: Donacobiidae

- Black-capped donacobius (Donacobius atricapilla)

== Swallows and martins ==
Order: Passeriformes Family: Hirundinidae

- Blue-and-white swallow (Pygochelidon cyanoleuca)
- Southern rough-winged swallow (Stelgidopteryx ruficollis)
- Brown-chested martin (Progne tapera)
- Purple martin (Progne subis)
- Caribbean martin (Progne dominicensis) (A)
- Cuban martin (Progne cryptoleuca) (A)
- Grey-breasted martin (Progne chalybea)
- White-winged swallow (Tachycineta albiventer)
- White-rumped swallow (Tachycineta leucorrhoa)
- Barn swallow (Hirundo rustica)
- Bank swallow (Riparia riparia)

== Gnatcatchers and gnatwrens ==
Order: Passeriformes Family: Polioptilidae

- Tropical gnatcatcher (Polioptila plumbea)

== Wrens ==
Order: Passeriformes Family: Troglodytidae

- Southern house wren (Troglodytes musculus)
- Moustached wren (Pheugopedius genibarbis)
- Buff-breasted wren (Cantorchilus leucotis)
- Long-billed wren (Cantorchilus longirostris) (EB)

== Mockingbirds, thrashers, and allies ==
Order: Passeriformes Family: Mimidae

- Chalk-browed mockingbird (Mimus saturninus)
- Tropical mockingbird (Mimus gilvus)

== Thrushes ==
Order: Passeriformes Family: Turdidae

- Pale-breasted thrush (Turdus leucomelas)
- Rufous-bellied thrush (Turdus rufiventris)
- Spectacled thrush (Turdus nudigenis)
- Creamy-bellied thrush (Turdus amaurochalinus)

== Estrildid finches ==
Order: Passeriformes Family: Estrildidae

- Common waxbill (Estrilda astrild) (I)

== Old World sparrows ==
Order: Passeriformes Family: Passeridae

- House sparrow (Passer domesticus) (I)

== Pipits ==
Order: Passeriformes Family: Motacillidae

- Yellowish pipit (Anthus chii)

== Finches and euphonias ==
Order: Passeriformes Family: Fringillidae

- Yellow-faced siskin (Spinus yarrellii) (EB)
- Hooded siskin (Spinus magellanicus)
- Purple-throated euphonia (Euphonia chlorotica)
- Violaceous euphonia (Euphonia violacea)

== New World sparrows ==
Order: Passeriformes Family: Passerellidae

- Grassland sparrow (Ammodramus humeralis)
- Pectoral sparrow (Arremon taciturnus)
- Rufous-collared sparrow (Zonotrichia capensis)

== Icterids ==
Order: Passeriformes Family: Icteridae

- Red-breasted meadowlark (Leistes militaris)
- White-browed meadowlark (Leistes superciliaris)
- Crested oropendola (Psarocolius decumanus)
- Solitary cacique (Cacicus solitarius)
- Yellow-rumped cacique (Cacicus cela)
- Campo troupial (Icterus jamacaii) (EB)
- Variable oriole (Icterus pyrrhopterus)
- Screaming cowbird (Molothrus rufoaxillaris)
- Giant cowbird (Molothrus oryzivorus)
- Shiny cowbird (Molothrus bonariensis)
- Chopi blackbird (Gnorimopsar chopi)
- Pale baywing (Agelaioides fringillarius)
- Chestnut-capped blackbird (Chrysomus ruficapillus)

== New World warblers ==
Order: Passeriformes Family: Parulidae

- Tropical parula (Setophaga pitiayumi)
- Flavescent warbler (Myiothlypis flaveola)
- Golden-crowned warbler (Basileuterus culicivorus)

== Cardinals, grosbeaks, and allies ==
Order: Passeriformes Family: Cardinalidae

- Hepatic tanager (Piranga flava)
- Yellow-green grosbeak (Caryothraustes canadensis)
- Blackish-blue seedeater (Amaurospiza moesta)
- Ultramarine grosbeak (Cyanoloxia brissonii)

== South American tanagers ==
Order: Passeriformes Family: Thraupidae

- Coal-crested finch (Charitospiza eucosma)
- Hooded tanager (Nemosia pileata)
- Scarlet-throated tanager (Compsothraupis loricata) (EB)
- Wedge-tailed grass-finch (Emberizoides herbicola)
- Blue finch (Rhopospina caerulescens)
- Guira tanager (Hemithraupis guira)
- Swallow tanager (Tersina viridis)
- Red-legged honeycreeper (Cyanerpes cyaneus)
- Blue dacnis (Dacnis cayana)
- Black-throated saltator (Saltatricula atricollis)
- Buff-throated saltator (Saltator maximus)
- Bluish-grey saltator (Saltator coerulescens)
- Green-winged saltator (Saltator similis)
- Bananaquit (Coereba flaveola)
- Sooty grassquit (Asemospiza fuliginosa)
- Blue-black grassquit (Volatinia jacarina)
- Grey-headed tanager (Eucometis penicillata)
- Pileated finch (Coryphospingus pileatus)
- White-lined tanager (Tachyphonus rufus)
- Silver-beaked tanager (Ramphocelus carbo)
- Lined seedeater (Sporophila lineola)
- Plumbeous seedeater (Sporophila plumbea)
- Yellow-bellied seedeater (Sporophila nigricollis)
- Double-collared seedeater (Sporophila caerulescens)
- White-throated seedeater (Sporophila albogularis) (EB)
- White-bellied seedeater (Sporophila leucoptera)
- Copper seedeater (Sporophila bouvreuil)
- Pearly-bellied seedeater (Sporophila pileata) (A)
- Chestnut-bellied seed-finch (Sporophila angolensis)
- Orange-headed tanager (Thlypopsis sordida)
- White-rumped tanager (Cypsnagra hirundinacea)
- Chestnut-vented conebill (Conirostrum speciosum)
- Bicoloured conebill (Conirostrum bicolor)
- Stripe-tailed yellow finch (Sicalis citrina)
- Saffron finch (Sicalis flaveola)
- Orange-fronted yellow finch (Sicalis columbiana)
- Grassland yellow finch (Sicalis luteola)
- Shrike-like tanager (Neothraupis fasciata)
- Magpie tanager (Cissopis leverianus)
- Black-faced tanager (Schistochlamys melanopis)
- Cinnamon tanager (Schistochlamys ruficapillus) (EB)
- Red-cowled cardinal (Paroaria dominicana) (EB)
- Sayaca tanager (Thraupis sayaca)
- Palm tanager (Thraupis palmarum)
- Burnished-buff tanager (Stilpnia cayana)
