= Slaty-masked tinamou =

Scientific classification
- Kingdom: Animalia
- Phylum: Chordata
- Class: Aves
- Infraclass: Palaeognathae
- Order: Tinamiformes
- Family: Tinamidae
- Genus: Crypturellus
- Species: C. resonans

Binomial name
- Crypturellus resonans (Morais et al., 2025)

Species of bird

The slaty-masked tinamou (Crypturellus resonans) is a species of ground bird found in the Serra do Divisor National Park in Brazil.

== Taxonomy ==
The species was originally described in the genus Tinamus but is now placed in the genus Crypturellus. Its body size, general morphology typical of small forest tinamous, and the presence of transverse plantar and tarsometatarsal scutes arranged in a single row of enlarged scales.

The phylogenetic relationships of the species within Tinamus have not been resolved. Certain morphological traits, including underpart coloration and a straight bill, suggest affinity with the T. variegatus/T. brevirostris/T. bartletti group.

=== Etymology ===
The species name resonans comes from the Latin resonare, meaning "to sound back" or "to echo."

== Description ==
Adult females described measured 296 to 320 mm in total length and weighed 342 to 362 g. The male has not yet been described.

The head shows dark slate gray lores, crown, nape, and hindneck. The cheeks, throat, neck, and upper chest are vivid cinnamon-rufous, becoming slightly more ochraceous on the upper cheeks. The throat may appear whitish-cream when the bird adopts a calling posture. A dark slate gray post-ocular stripe crosses the auriculars and is bordered by cinnamon-rufous cheeks and a cinnamon-ochre superciliary stripe, producing a masked facial pattern. A broad slate gray stripe descends from the crown along the hindneck and blends into the mantle.

The upperparts, including mantle, scapulars, upper back, and dorsal wing surfaces, are uniformly taupe brownish-gray and lack transverse barring. The remiges are slightly darker dorsally and light gray ventrally with a silvery sheen. The underwing coverts are white.

The abdomen is sepia with a distinct whitish cream area along the central lower belly and inner thighs. The flanks are darker sepia with narrow whitish-cream feather margins. The undertail coverts bear a central dark-brown triangular mark with whitish-cream edges.

The iris is dark brown. The tarsi and toes are dull olive-lead gray. The bill is straight and dark gray with a slate gloss, with a slight dorsal curvature of the maxilla, with the base of the maxilla bearing a small ivory white spot. The mandible is bicolored, with dark-gray proximal edges and an ivory white ventral surface.

== Distribution ==
The slaty-masked tinamou is known only from Serra do Divisor National Park in western Amazonia, Brazil. It was recorded on steep forest floor at elevations of 310 to 435 m, within a narrow ecotonal band between submontane and stunted forest. Its habitat is marked by extensive root mats and accumulated leaf litter over quartzitic sandstone, forming the substrate used for movement and foraging. Fifteen individuals were documented. Spatial analysis and habitat-based modeling of these records yielded a preliminary population estimate of about 2,100 individuals.

== Ecology ==
=== Behavior ===
Individuals observed by researchers showed little avoidance behavior when approached and appeared unusually tolerant of human presence. They were also observed moving slowly across open understory areas without evident vigilance, in contrast to the more cautious behavior typically reported in other tinamous.

=== Vocalizations ===
The species's vocalization differs from other documented tinamou songs. Its song is loud and carries over long distances, though echo and acoustic diffusion along steep slopes alter its temporal structure. Its vocalizations show similarities to those of Tinamus variegatus, incorporating both smooth and frequency-modulated notes.

== Conservation ==
The known range of the slaty-masked tinamou lies within a federally protected national park. However, the area has been identified as facing potential future threats, including proposed changes in land use designation and plans for infrastructure development and mining activities. The restricted distribution and small estimated population suggest potential vulnerability to habitat disturbance.
