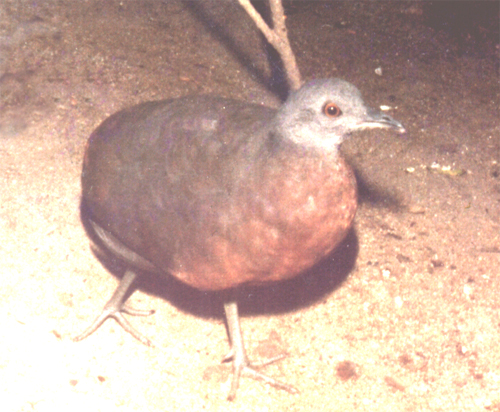

Conservation status
- Least Concern (IUCN 3.1)

Scientific classification
- Kingdom: Animalia
- Phylum: Chordata
- Class: Aves
- Infraclass: Palaeognathae
- Order: Tinamiformes
- Family: Tinamidae
- Genus: Crypturellus
- Species: C. obsoletus

Binomial name
- Crypturellus obsoletus (Temminck, 1815)

Subspecies
- C. o. obsoletus (Temminck, 1815); C. o. griseiventris (Salvadori, 1895); C. o. hypochraceus (Miranda-Ribeiro, 1938); C. o. punensis (Chubb, 1917); C. o. traylori (Blake, 1961); Traylor's Tinamou; C. o. ochraceiventris (Stolzmann, 1926); C. o. castaneus (Sclater, 1858); C. o. knoxi (Phelps, 1976); C. o. cerviniventris (Sclater & Salvin, 1873)

Audio

= Brown tinamou =

Species of bird

The brown tinamou (Crypturellus obsoletus) is a brownish ground bird found in humid lowland and montane forest in tropical and subtropical South America.

== Taxonomy ==
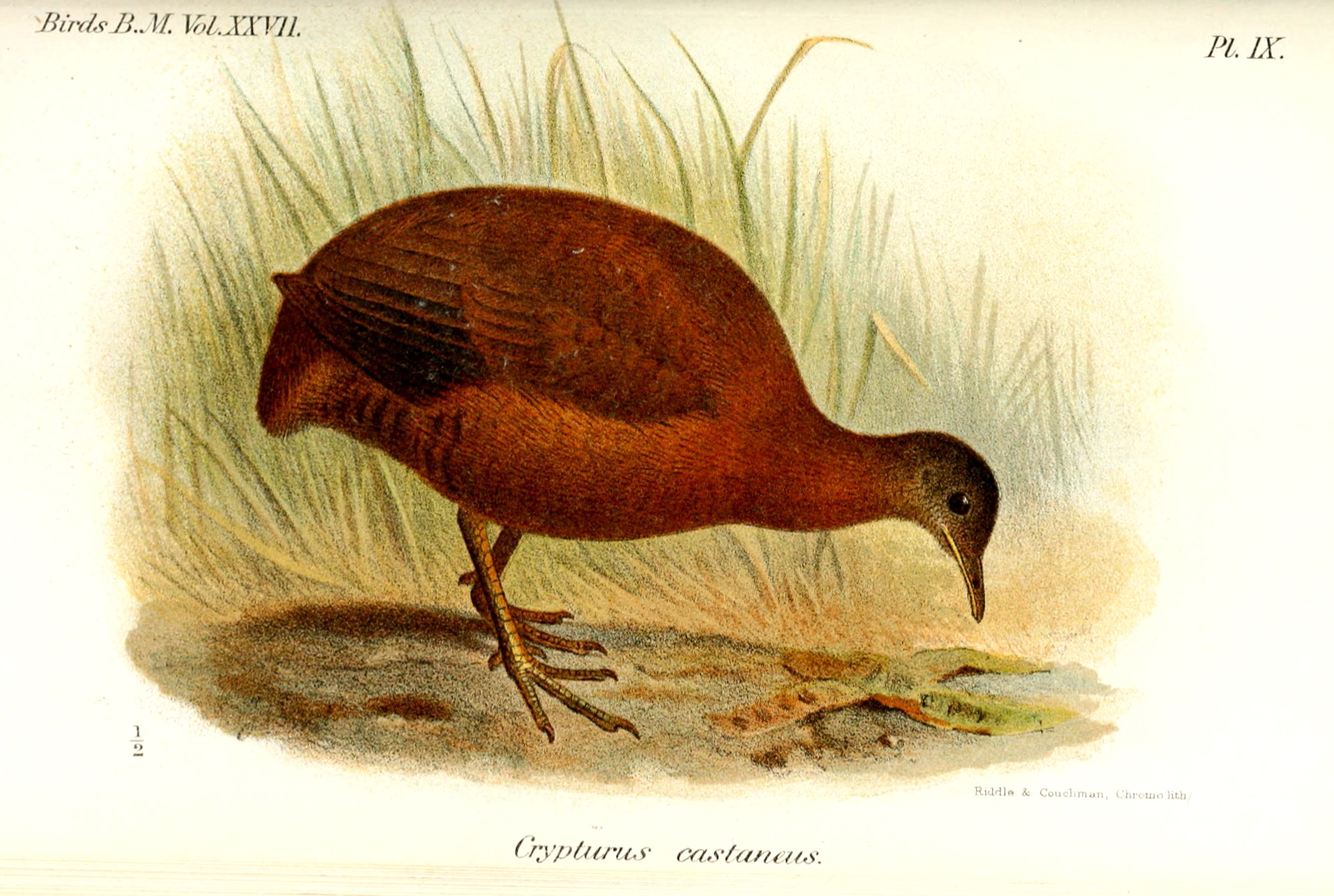
Subspecies C. o. castaneus, illustration by Keulemans, 1895

All tinamous are usually treated in a single family (Tinamidae) and, contrary to traditional classifications, they are embedded within the group known as ratites, most closely related to the extinct moa of New Zealand. However, unlike ratites (ostriches, rheas, moa, kiwis, emus, cassowaries & elephantbirds), tinamous are capable of flight, although in general, they are not strong fliers. Different ratite lineages evolved separately from ancient flying birds, and tinamous are thought to most closely resemble these ancestral ratites.

=== Subspecies ===
Its distribution is highly disjunct and the subspecies, which quite probably represent more than one species, are distributed as follows:

- C. o. obsoletus, the nominate race, occurs in the Atlantic forest in southeastern Brazil, eastern Paraguay and Misiones, Argentina.
- C. o. griseiventris occurs throughout the valley of Rio Tapajós, Brazil; southwestern Pará, southeastern Amazonas, and central Mato Grosso.
- C. o. hypochraceus occurs in upper Rio Madeira valley in central Rondônia, Brazil.
- C. o. punensis occurs in the Yungas of central Bolivia and extreme southeastern Peru.
- C. o. traylori, Traylor's tinamou, occurs in the Marcapata Valley of central Cusco, southeastern Peru; sometimes treated as a separate species.
- C. o. ochraceiventris occurs along the east Andean slopes in central Peru; Huanuco, Pasco, Junín, northern Ayacucho, and Cusco.
- C. o. castaneus occurs east of the Andes in northern Peru, Ecuador, and Colombia; sometimes treated as a separate species.
- C. o. knoxi occurs in sub-tropical northwestern Venezuela.
- C. o. cerviniventris occurs in northern Venezuela.

Additionally, there are records from north Mato Grosso in Brazil, but it remains unclear which subspecies is involved. Most subspecies occur in highlands, but hypochraceus, griseiventris, and the southern populations of the nominate taxon occur in lowlands. It is uncommon to rare in most of its range, but commoner in southeastern Brazil, where it is the most frequently encountered member of its genus.

== Etymology ==
Crypturellus is formed from three Latin or Greek words. kruptos meaning covered or hidden, oura meaning tail, and ellus meaning diminutive. Therefore, Crypturellus means small hidden tail.

== Description ==
The brown tinamou is approximately 25 to 30 cm (9.8–11.8 in) in length and it weighs about 350 to 550 g (12–19 oz). Depending on the subspecies involved, the upperparts vary from dark sooty-brown to bright chestnut and the underparts, which usually are paler than the upperparts, vary from chestnut to light ochraceous. The subspecies griseiventris is unique in having pale buff-grey underparts. All subspecies can be separated from the superficially similar little tinamou by the greyish (rather than whitish) throat. Females are typically larger and more rufescent than the males.

== Behavior ==
As other tinamous of its genus, it is a shy, ground-dwelling species, which usually is encountered singly or in pairs. It feeds on fruits, insects, and seeds. The female lays 4-5 deep pink to dark glossy brown eggs on the ground; typically in a small depression at the base of a tree. Its song consists of loud, high-pitched whistles, but exact structure and timbre vary over its range.

== Range and habitat ==
The brown tinamou is located in northern Venezuela, Colombia, Ecuador, Peru, northern and southern Brazil, extreme northeastern Argentina, eastern Bolivia, and eastern Paraguay. They may also be in Uruguay.

They live in tropical and sub-tropical moist lowland and montane forests, preferring elevations between 1,300 to 2,900 m (4,300–9,500 ft).

== Conservation ==
The IUCN classifies the brown tinamou as Least Concern, with an occurrence range of 1,700,000 km^{2} (660,000 sq mi).
