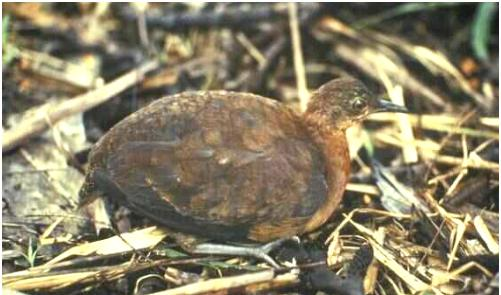

Conservation status
- Least Concern (IUCN 3.1)

Scientific classification
- Kingdom: Animalia
- Phylum: Chordata
- Class: Aves
- Infraclass: Palaeognathae
- Order: Tinamiformes
- Family: Tinamidae
- Genus: Crypturellus
- Species: C. duidae

Binomial name
- Crypturellus duidae Zimmer, 1938

= Grey-legged tinamou =

Species of bird

The grey-legged tinamou (Crypturellus duidae), alternatively, the gray-legged tinamou, is a small ground-dwelling bird endemic to the neotropics. It is a rarely seen bird due to its small size and discreet appearance.

== Taxonomy ==
The grey-legged tinamou was first described by John T. Zimmer in 1938. The grey-legged tinamou, like all tinamous, is in the family tinamidae and the infraclass palaeognathae. In addition, There are 21 species in the genus Crypterellus, all of which are all South American tinamous. There are no subspecies of the grey-legged tinamou; it is monotypic. The genus name, Crypterellus, is formed from three latin or greek words ‘krusptis’ meaning covered or hidden, ‘oura’ meaning tail and 'ellus' meaning diminutive. Therefore, crypterullus means small hidden tail.

There is much debate in the scientific community about the membership of tinamous to the ratite clade. Ratites are an order of large flightless birds that include ostrichs, kiwis, emus, and the extinct moa and elephant bird. Tinamous were historically considered a sister clade to ratites because they did not share the flightless quality of the rest of the group. However, some genetic evidence points to tinamous being close relatives of Moas, indicating that tinamous are also members of the ratite clade. This phylogeny suggests a novel method of the evolution of flightlessness in ratites and means that flightlessness was lost multiple times among different ratites. This taxonomy is, however, unresolved and requires further investigation for a conclusive answer.

== Description ==
The grey-legged tinamou is a small ground-dwelling bird and a weak flyer. The grey-legged tinamou has a rusty coloured neck and upper back with a tinge of grey on its upper breast. The wings and the body of the tinamou are a scaly brownish black. The grey-legged tinamou has a pronounced black eye. They vary from 28-31 cm in height.Males have a prominent dark crown of feathers on the top of the head, whereas females have a fully rusty coloured head. Females have markings on their backs and wings. The legs are a slate grey coloured which is described in the name of the species.

The grey-legged tinamou can be misidentified with the variegated tinamou. However, the variegated tinamou has a completely grey head and bolder barring on the wings and back.

== Distribution and habitat ==
Grey-legged tinamous are native to South America, including Columbia, Peru, Ecuador, Guyana, Venezuela, and northern Brazil. However, its distribution could be even further as the population is sparsely distributed and found in fragmented landscape. It is found in dry shrubland up to 500 m (1,600 ft) in altitude. As a poor soil specialist, the grey-legged tinamous are commonly found in Amazonian white-sand forests. These forests are characterized by low-hanging canopies and dense foliage, allowing the grey-legged tinamous to remain inconspicuous. They have also been documented in peatland habitats.

== Behavior ==
=== Vocalization ===
The call of the grey-legged tinamou is described as a short hollow sounding two-syllable whistle, with the pneumonic: “whoo-whoooooooo” with a slight rise near the end.. The call lasts 2-3 seconds. This is the only vocalization of the grey-legged tinamou recorded. See Grey-legged tinamou call eBird. Their call is most frequently at dawn and dusk, but also during the day when it is cloudy or rainy.

=== Diet ===
The grey-legged tinamou primarily consumes fruits and other plant matter. They feed primarily on low hanging or fallen fruit. Like all tinamous they forage on the ground and in low bushes. They have also been documented to consume insects and other ground-dwelling invertebrates .

=== Reproduction ===
Although there is no available information on the reproduction of the grey-legged tinamou, most tinamou species are ground nesters, typically choosing to nest in the depressions of the buttress roots of trees.

== Conservation ==
In 2020 the IUCN classified the grey-legged tinamou as Least Concern, although there were calls to reclassified the species due to global population declines in the last two years in certain parts of their range. This is primarily due to increased threat from deforestation. The species is also threatened by hunting practices in the area. Indeed the regions the grey-legged tinamou is most commonly found is facing significant anthropogenic changes. although due to their large fragmented range there was yet to be detailed survey of their populations across their entire range.
