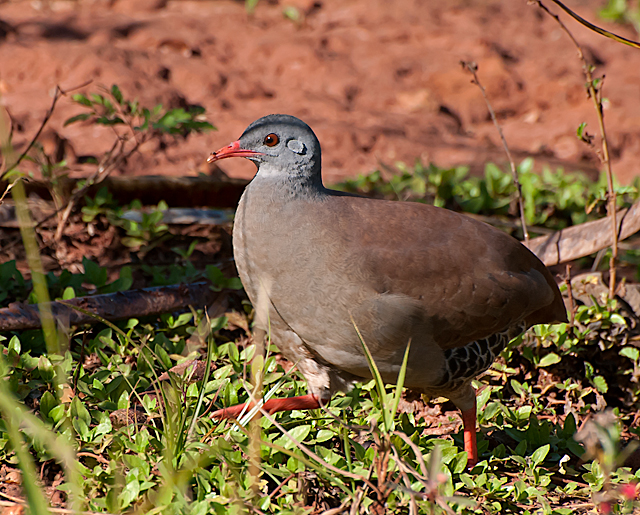

Conservation status
- Least Concern (IUCN 3.1)

Scientific classification
- Kingdom: Animalia
- Phylum: Chordata
- Class: Aves
- Infraclass: Palaeognathae
- Order: Tinamiformes
- Family: Tinamidae
- Genus: Crypturellus
- Species: C. parvirostris

Binomial name
- Crypturellus parvirostris (Wagler, 1827)

= Small-billed tinamou =

Species of bird

The small-billed tinamou (Crypturellus parvirostris) is a type of tinamou commonly found in dry savanna in Amazonian South America.

== Taxonomy ==
The small-billed tinamou was formally described in 1827 by the German naturalist Johann Georg Wagler based on a specimen collected in Brazil. Wagler coined the binomial name Crypturus parvirostris. The specific epithet combines the Latin parvus meaning "small" with -rostris meaning "-billed". The small-billed tinamou is now one of 21 species placed in the genus Crypturellus that was introduced in 1914 by the British ornithologists Baron Brabourne and Charles Chubb. The species is monotypic: no subspecies are recognised.

All tinamou are from the family Tinamidae, and in the larger scheme are also ratites. Unlike other ratites, tinamous can fly, although in general, they are not strong fliers. All ratites evolved from prehistoric flying birds, and tinamous are the closest living relative of these birds.

== Description ==
The small-billed tinamou is approximately 22 cm (8.7 in) in length. Its upperparts are dark brown, with grey to brownish underparts and head. Its bill and legs are red.

== Distribution and habitat ==
The small-billed tinamou prefers dry savanna, but will also reside in lowland shrubland. Its range is Amazonian South America; Brazil except for the southeastern portion, northeastern Peru, eastern Bolivia, Paraguay, and northeastern Argentina.

== Behavior ==
Like other tinamous, the small-billed eats fruit off the ground or low-lying bushes. They also eat small amounts of invertebrates, flower buds, tender leaves, seeds, and roots. The male incubates the eggs which may come from as many as 4 different females, and then will raise them until they are ready to be on their own, usually 2–3 weeks. The nest is located on the ground in dense brush or between raised root buttresses.

== Domestication ==
The small billed tinamou has been considered an ideal candidate for domestication as the birds can raise 3-4 broods per year and are resistant to diseases that affect chickens.

== Conservation ==
The IUCN classifies this tinamou as Least Concern, with an occurrence range of 6,700,000 km^{2} (2,600,000 sq mi).
