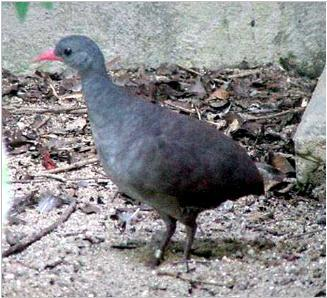
- Tataupa tinamou (Crypturellus tataupa)

Scientific classification
- Kingdom: Animalia
- Phylum: Chordata
- Class: Aves
- Infraclass: Palaeognathae
- Order: Tinamiformes
- Family: Tinamidae
- Subfamily: Tinaminae
- Genus: Crypturellus; Brabourne & Chubb, C, 1914

Type species
- Tinamus tataupa (Tataupa tinamou) Temminck, 1815

= Crypturellus =

Genus of birds

Crypturellus is a genus of tinamous containing mostly forest species. However, there are the odd few that are grassland or steppe tinamous. The genus contains 22 species.

== Taxonomy ==
The genus Crypturellus was introduced in 1914 by the British ornithologists Baron Brabourne and Charles Chubb with the Tataupa tinamou as the type species. The genus name combines the Ancient Greek κρυπτός (kruptós) meaning "hidden" with οὐρά (oura) meaning "tail". The -ellus is a diminutive so that the name means "small hidden tail".

== Description ==
Crypturellus members, like other tinamous, have a cryptic color scheme dominated by browns, buffs, yellows, and greys. Unlike the rest of the family, these birds show some sexual dimorphism: the females are more heavily barred than the males and are also a bit brighter and larger.

== Range ==
The majority of species occupy forests or rain forests, preferring lower elevations. They range from Uruguay to Mexico. However, the earliest known occurrence of the genus is a fossil humerus, described as Crypturellus reai, from the Early Miocene Santa Cruz Formation of Patagonia.

== Vocalization ==
Crypturellus are a very loud group of birds with melodious calls. They tend to use lower frequency when they call than other members of the Tinamou. Males and females have different calls and each species also has different calls. Normally each sex will have a long and a short phrase call. The genus can be grouped into two partial groups based on the similarity of their calls.

- Group 1
  - Undulated tinamou
  - Red-legged tinamou
  - Yellow-legged tinamou
- Group 2
  - Brown tinamou
  - Small-billed tinamou
  - Tataupa tinamou

Some, like the slaty-breasted tinamou are quiet and hide during the middle of the day, choosing this time to take naps and conserve energy. The slaty-breasted tinamous also have a unique call amongst themselves, so much so that individual birds can be recognized by their calls. Most members of the genus have a variation in their calls, within the species, based on their geographical location. They also are known to use regular calling sites.

== Feeding ==
Similar to other forest tinamou, the members of this genus prefer to eat fleshy fruit; however like tinamous in general they are opportunistic and will eat a variety of foods including insects, which they have been known to leap 1 metre (39 in) high to obtain.

== Breeding ==
Courtship technique for the members of Crypturellus consists of the male lowering his breast to the ground, stretching his neck forward and raising his posterior vertically. This will cause the male to appear larger and longer than normal, which not only impresses the female but also benefits the male in that it scares away competitors.

Females outnumber the males with some of the species, such as the variegated tinamou, having a 4:1 female-to-male ratio. They also only have a 2-egg clutch, which would explain why they are one of the species that have multiple clutches.

Once copulation has taken place, the female will choose a nest site that is typically a depression covered with leaves next to a tree trunk, usually between a couple of buttresses. Members of the genus that are savanna style birds such as the small-billed tinamou will instead lay their eggs in a cavity near a clump of grass. The eggs are oval or elliptical on the smaller birds and near spherical in the larger birds, such as the undulated tinamou and the Brazilian tinamou. The colorings of the eggs are varied, but in general are brightly colored with no splotches or spots; the colors fade over time and usually will change to a less overt color midway through the incubation period. The predominant colors are chocolate or red wine with the eggs of yellow-legged tinamou, undulated tinamou, little tinamou, and red-legged tinamou using different color schemes.

Clutch size can be upwards of 9-16 eggs, however these larger clutches are the products of multiple females. The male will incubate and care for the young. Incubation takes about 16 days. If he dies, the female will take over. When the chicks cross cleared areas, they will run like the chicks of rails. Some members of the genus mature rapidly, like the slaty-breasted tinamou which can gain adult size (not weight) by 20 days.

== Relationships ==
Here is a cladogram of the relationship of species within Crypturellus, from an integumentary phylogenetic study on the Tinamidae, 2013.

- Crypturellus
  - - Crypturellus transfasciatus
    - Crypturellus cinnamomeus
  - - Crypturellus undulatus
    - - - Crypturellus erythropus
        - - - Crypturellus duidae
            - Crypturellus noctivagus
          - - Crypturellus variegatus
            - - Crypturellus casiquiare
              - - Crypturellus brevirostris
                - Crypturellus bartletti
      - - Crypturellus atrocapillus
        - - - Crypturellus kerriae
            - Crypturellus boucardi
          - - Crypturellus strigulosus
            - - - Crypturellus cinereus
                - Crypturellus berlepschi
              - - - Crypturellus ptaritepui
                  - Crypturellus soui
                - - Crypturellus obsoletus
                  - - Crypturellus parvirostris
                    - Crypturellus tataupa

Crypturellus parvirostris and Crypturellus tataupa are also the most derived species on a tree of the entire Paleognathae.

== Species ==
The genus contains 22 species:

- Slaty-masked tinamou, Crypturellus resonans – Sierra del Divisor, border between Peru and Brazil
- Berlepsch's tinamou (Crypturellus berlepschi) – coastal forests of northwestern Colombia and northwestern Ecuador
- Little tinamou (Crypturellus soui) – southern Mexico to northeastern Brazil west to Ecuador and east to French Guiana and also Trinidad
- Cinereous tinamou (Crypturellus cinereus) – southeastern Colombia, southern Venezuela, Guyana, French Guiana, Suriname, northeastern Brazil, and northern Bolivia
- Tepui tinamou (Crypturellus ptaritepui) – the tepuis of southern Venezuela
- Brown tinamou (Crypturellus obsoletus) – northern Venezuela west through Ecuador, Peru, northern and southern Brazil, extreme northeastern Argentina, eastern Bolivia, and Paraguay
- Undulated tinamou (Crypturellus undulatus) – northern and central South America except Suriname and French Guiana
- Pale-browed tinamou (Crypturellus transfasciatus) – coastal forests of Ecuador and extreme northwestern Peru
- Brazilian tinamou (Crypturellus strigulosus) – central Brazil south of the Amazon River, northwestern Bolivia, and eastern Peru
- Grey-legged tinamou (Crypturellus duidae) – the tropical forests of east central Colombia and southern Venezuela
- Red-legged tinamou (Crypturellus erythropus) – from northern Colombia east to French Guiana and south to northern Brazil and also Margarita Island
- Yellow-legged tinamou (Crypturellus noctivagus) – the lowlands of eastern Brazil
- Black-capped tinamou (Crypturellus atrocapillus) – the lowlands of southeastern Peru and northern Bolivia
- Thicket tinamou (Crypturellus cinnamomeus) – from northwestern Costa Rica north to Puebla, Mexico, and all of the Atlantic coastal Mexico and Pacific coastal Mexico excluding Sonora, Mexico
- Slaty-breasted tinamou or Boucard's tinamou (Crypturellus boucardi) – the gulf coastal region of Central America from southeastern Mexico to northeastern Honduras and southeastern Honduras to northern Costa Rica
- Choco tinamou (Crypturellus kerriae) – humid foothills of southeastern Panama to northwestern Colombia
- Variegated tinamou (Crypturellus variegatus) – northern Bolivia, Amazonian Brazil, French Guiana, Guyana, Suriname, Venezuela, and Colombia
- Rusty tinamou or short-billed tinamou (Crypturellus brevirostris) – French Guiana, eastern Peru, and northwestern and northeastern Brazil
- Bartlett's tinamou (Crypturellus bartletti) – western Amazonian Brazil, northern Bolivia, and eastern Peru
- Small-billed tinamou (Crypturellus parvirostris) – from the Amazon Basin in Brazil to northeastern Argentina
- Barred tinamou (Crypturellus casiquiare) – eastern Colombia and southern Venezuela
- Tataupa tinamou (Crypturellus tataupa) – parts of Peru, northeastern Brazil, Paraguay, southern Brazil, eastern Bolivia, and northern Argentina

There is also an extinct species:

- †Crypturellus reai Chandler 2012 – dating from the Early-Middle Miocene (Santacrucian; 16.3–17.5 million years ago)

== Sources ==
- Brands, Sheila (Aug 14, 2008). "Systema Naturae 2000 / Classification, Genus Crypturellus". Project: The Taxonomicon.
- Clements, James (2007). The Clements Checklist of the Birds of the World (6 ed.). Ithaca, NY: Cornell University Press. ISBN 978-0-8014-4501-9.
- Gotch, A. F. (1995) [1979]. "Tinamous". Latin Names Explained. A Guide to the Scientific Classifications of Reptiles, Birds & Mammals. New York, NY: Facts on File. p. 183. ISBN 0-8160-3377-3.
- Remsen Jr., J. V.; et al. (7 Aug 2008). "Classification of birds of South America Part 01". South American Classification Committee. American Ornithologists' Union.
