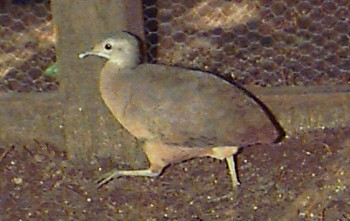

Conservation status
- Least Concern (IUCN 3.1)

Scientific classification
- Kingdom: Animalia
- Phylum: Chordata
- Class: Aves
- Infraclass: Palaeognathae
- Order: Tinamiformes
- Family: Tinamidae
- Genus: Crypturellus
- Species: C. soui

Binomial name
- Crypturellus soui (Hermann, 1783)

Synonyms
- Tinamus soui

Audio
- Voice

= Little tinamou =

Species of bird

The little tinamou (Crypturellus soui) is a species of tinamou. It is found in Central and South America, as well as on the Caribbean island of Trinidad.

== Taxonomy ==
The little tinamou was formally described in 1783 by the French naturalist Johann Hermann under the binomial name Tinamus soui. Hermann based his account on "Le Souï" that had been described in 1778 by the French polymath, the Comte de Buffon. A hand-coloured engraving by François-Nicolas Martinet was published to accompany Buffon's text. The type locality is Cayenne in French Guiana. The specific epithet soui is from the onomatopoeic name for the little tinamou that was used in the local language spoken in Cayenne.

The little tinamou is now one of 21 species placed in the genus Crypturellus that was introduced in 1914 by the British ornithologists Baron Brabourne and Charles Chubb. All tinamous are in the family Tinamidae, and in the larger scheme are also palaeognaths, a group that includes the more widely known flightless ratites such as ostriches and emus. Unlike the ratites, though, tinamous can fly, although in general they are not strong fliers. The genus name Crypturellus combines the Ancient Greek κρυπτός (kruptós) meaning "hidden" with οὐρά (oura) meaning "tail". The -ellus is a diminutive so that the name means "small hidden tail". Although it looks similar to other ground-dwelling birds like quail and grouse in the order Galliformes, it is not closely related to these species.

=== Subspecies ===
Fourteen subspecies are recognised. They differ in their plumage coloration.

- C. s. meserythrus (Sclater, PL, 1860) – south Mexico to southeast Nicaragua
- C. s. modestus (Cabanis, 1869) – Costa Rica and west Panama
- C. s. capnodes Wetmore, 1963 – northwest Panama
- C. s. poliocephalus (Aldrich, 1937) – Panama (Pacific slope)
- C. s. panamensis (Carriker, 1910) – Panama
- C. s. mustelinus (Bangs, 1905) – northeast Colombia and northwest Venezuela
- C. s. soui (Hermann, 1783) – east Colombia to northeast Brazil
- C. s. andrei (Brabourne & Chubb, C, 1914) – Trinidad and northeast Venezuela
- C. s. caucae (Chapman, 1912) – central north Colombia
- C. s. harterti (Brabourne & Chubb, C, 1914) – west Colombia and west Ecuador
- C. s. caquetae (Chapman, 1915) – southeast Colombia
- C. s. nigriceps (Chapman, 1923) – east Ecuador and northeast Peru
- C. s. albigularis (Brabourne & Chubb, C, 1914) – northeast Brazil
- C. s. inconspicuus Carriker, 1935 – central Peru to east Bolivia

== Description ==
The little tinamou is approximately 21.4 to 24 cm (8.4–9.4 in) in overall length. Males weigh around 207 g (7.3 oz), females 174–238 g (6.1–8.4 oz). Females are slightly larger and heavier than males. It has an unbarred sooty-brown plumage which transitions to grey on the head. The foreneck is whitish. While the underside of both male and female is cinnamon buff, the female is a lighter shade. The legs can be grey, olive, or yellow. Both male and female are almost tailless. The female is usually more brightly colored, the male tends to be darker and less rufescent.

== Distribution and habitat ==
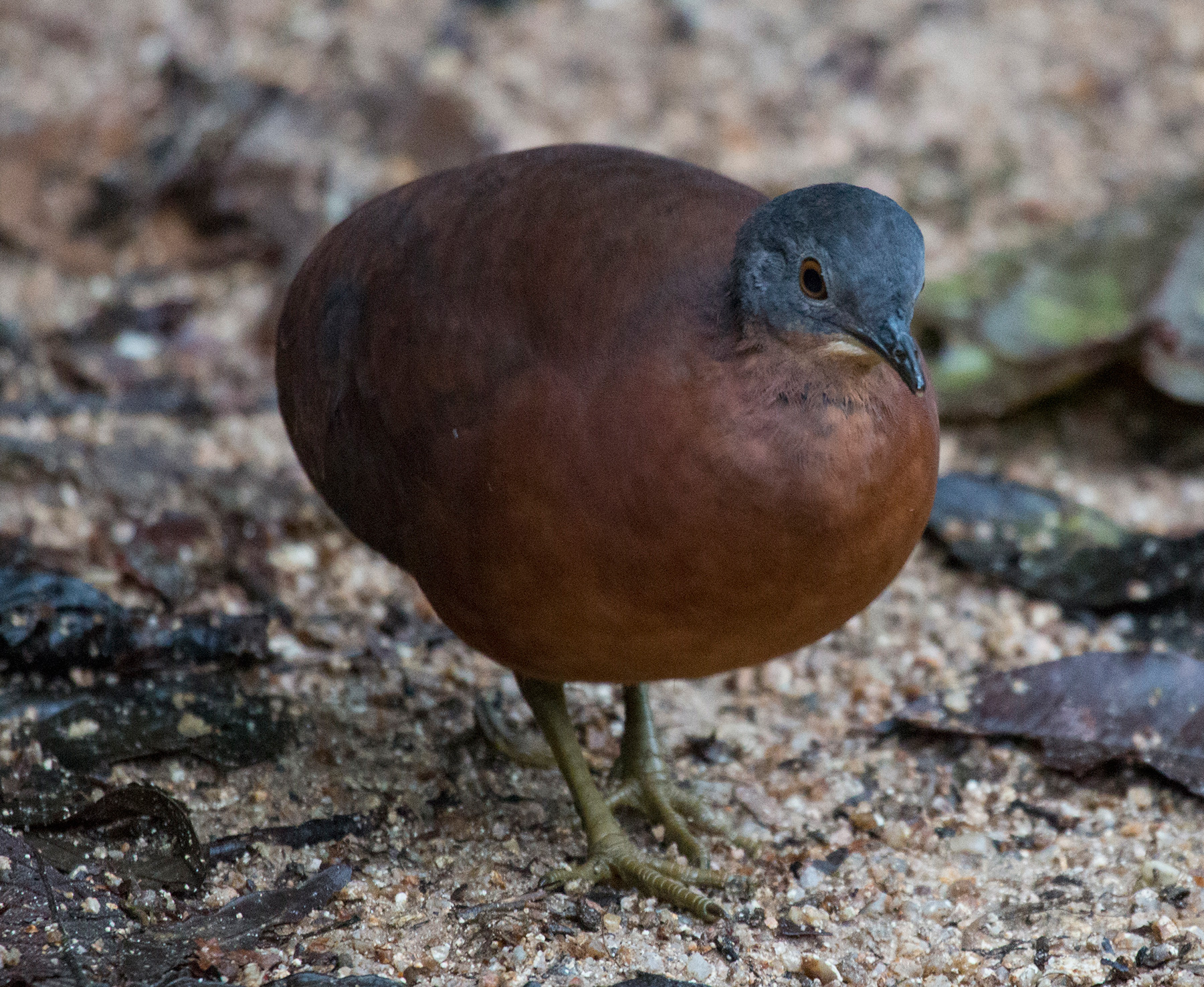
Near Zamora, Ecuador

It is a resident breeder in tropical lowland forests, rivers-edge forests, lowland evergreen forest, secondary forest, and lowland shrublands up to an altitude of 2,000 m (6,600 ft). They are also fairly successful utilizing cleared forests and plantations or farmed land.

== Behavior ==
Little tinamou are shy, secretive, and pair-solitary animals. Despite their abundance, they are rarely sighted. In the field, they are detected by sound more often than sight. The whistle call is a soft, descending whinny (also a series of single notes, tempo increasing at end) produced by both sexes. They eat seeds, berries, and some insects. They can fly but will run unless flight is necessary. They are highly territorial and will attack when encroached upon if the intruding bird is not their mate.

=== Breeding ===
The breeding season of the little tinamou ranges from May to October. The eggs are laid in a small depression in the forest floor, sometimes lined with a few leaves at the base of a tree or in dense brush. The female performs a courtship behavior and the eggs are incubated by the male. Male nest attendance is strong, up to 14 days without leaving the nest in one study. The clutch is typically two glossy dark-purple eggs (up to three have been observed). The eggs are about 43.1 mm × 32.4 mm (1.70 in × 1.28 in) in size and are oval in shape, without the usual pointed and blunt ends. They are glossy and purple drab in color. The young are cared for only by the male. They are precocial, and begin pecking the ground on the first day. They can run almost as soon as they hatch. By weeks 3–4 they are capable of full flight. Egg laying begins at one year old.

== Conservation ==
The IUCN list the little tinamou as Least Concern, with an occurrence range of 9,500,000 km^{2} (3,700,000 sq mi).
