= Rusty tinamou =

Conservation status
- Least Concern (IUCN 3.1)

Scientific classification
- Kingdom: Animalia
- Phylum: Chordata
- Class: Aves
- Infraclass: Palaeognathae
- Order: Tinamiformes
- Family: Tinamidae
- Genus: Crypturellus
- Species: C. brevirostris

Binomial name
- Crypturellus brevirostris (Pelzeln, 1863)

Synonyms
- Tinamus brevirostris Pelzeln, A, 1863

Species of bird

The rusty tinamou (Crypturellus brevirostris), also known as the short-billed tinamou, is an elusive, ground-dwelling bird first described in 1863 by Austrian ornithologist August von Pelzeln. It is a type of tinamou commonly found in swamp forest in tropical regions of South America currently without any subspecies.

== Taxonomy ==
The rusty tinamou is a monotypic species. All tinamou are from the family Tinamidae, and in the larger scheme are also ratites. Unlike other ratites, tinamous can fly, although in general, they are not strong fliers. All ratites evolved from prehistoric flying birds, and tinamous are the closest living relative of these birds.

== Range and habitat ==
The rusty tinamou's habitat mainly consists of terra firme and seasonally flooded forests however it has also been observed living in forests on poor soils, such as saprolite soil, white-sand forest and forests around inselbergs. Currently the species has not been observed at an elevation higher than 500 m (1,600 ft) above sea level. Although this species is considered to be fairly common it is elusive across the entirety of its range. It is discontinuously distributed across northwestern and northeastern Brazil, far east Colombia, Guyana, Suriname, French Guiana and eastern Peru all of which are resident populations.

== Description ==
The rusty tinamou is 27 to 29 cm (10.6–11.4 in) in length. Its upper parts are rufous and boldly barred with black, its throat is white, its breast is bright rufous, its belly is white, and its flanks are barred black. Its crown is chestnut in color with legs that are yellowish-grey. This coloration lends itself well to blending into the forest floor and underbrush. Females tend to be larger with a weight of 295 g (10.4 oz) compared to that of 209–233 g (7.4–8.2 oz) observed in males. Generally the species has a tail length of roughly 5 cm (2.0 in) and a wing length between 11 and 15 cm (4.3 and 5.9 in). These measurements do not seem to exhibit any difference between the sexes.

== Behavior ==
The rusty tinamou is diurnal and omnivorous. During the day it forages for invertebrates and seeds among the forest understory. Male tinamous of the Crypturellus genus build a nest on the ground by scraping a small depression into the ground. It then attracts a female by calling to her where she will then lay her eggs into the nest. The eggs may come from multiple females. The male incubates and protects the eggs until they are ready to hatch and be on their own usually in 2-3 weeks. The average age for breeding in the rusty tinamou is generally 2 years of age.

== Vocalizations ==
The rusty tinamou is often distinguished by its voice rather than it appearance. Though it does not frequently sing, it has a characteristic primary song beginning with a whistled note proceeded by more rapid whistles that rise in pitch. At its fastest the song reaches approximately 2.5 notes per second. The secondary song consists of short irregular whistles. There is no present evidence to indicate weather the male or female of the species is the primary singer. On several occasions the rusty tinamou has been observed responding to the call of the variegated tinamou with its primary song.

== Longevity and mortality ==
Currently the longest known lived individual survived to almost 15 years of age. The adult annual survival rate is 82% with a generation age of 5.45 years. While the global population size has not been properly quantified the population is currently believed to be decreasing at a rate of 7% over a 10 year period. This is due to the species losing 5.4-6.1% of its believed suitable habitat over three generations (20 years).

== Human relationship ==
The rusty tinamou has not been observed to be in any larger scale bird trade. However, due to its commonality across its habitat along with its main mode of defense, camouflage being disrupted by deforestation across its range it has become more susceptible to hunting and trapping.
