= Crypturellus reai =

Crypturellus reai Temporal range: Early-Mid Miocene (Santacrucian) ~17.5–16.3 Ma

Scientific classification
- Kingdom: Animalia
- Phylum: Chordata
- Class: Aves
- Infraclass: Palaeognathae
- Order: Tinamiformes
- Family: Tinamidae
- Genus: Crypturellus
- Species: †C. reai

Binomial name
- †Crypturellus reai Chandler 2012

Synonyms
- aff. Crypturellus Brabourne & Chubb 1914

Extinct species of bird

Crypturellus reai is an extinct species of Miocene fossil bird in the tinamou family. It was described in 2012 from material originally excavated by American palaeontologist Barnum Brown in 1899 in Patagonia. The specific epithet honours Amadeo M. Rea, an educator, mentor and friend of the describer.

== History ==
The holotype left humerus is held in the American Museum of Natural History (AMNH), which was a sponsor of the 1898-99 Patagonian expedition, led by John Bell Hatcher, on which Brown was the AMNH representative. The site of the discovery was a wash at Cañadón de las Vacas, southeastern Santa Cruz Province, Argentina. It was found in Early-Middle Miocene (Santacrucian; 16.3–17.5 million-year-old) deposits of the fossiliferous Santa Cruz Formation. The site is considerably further south than the ranges of extant members of Crypturellus, which inhabit tropical or subtropical environments.
