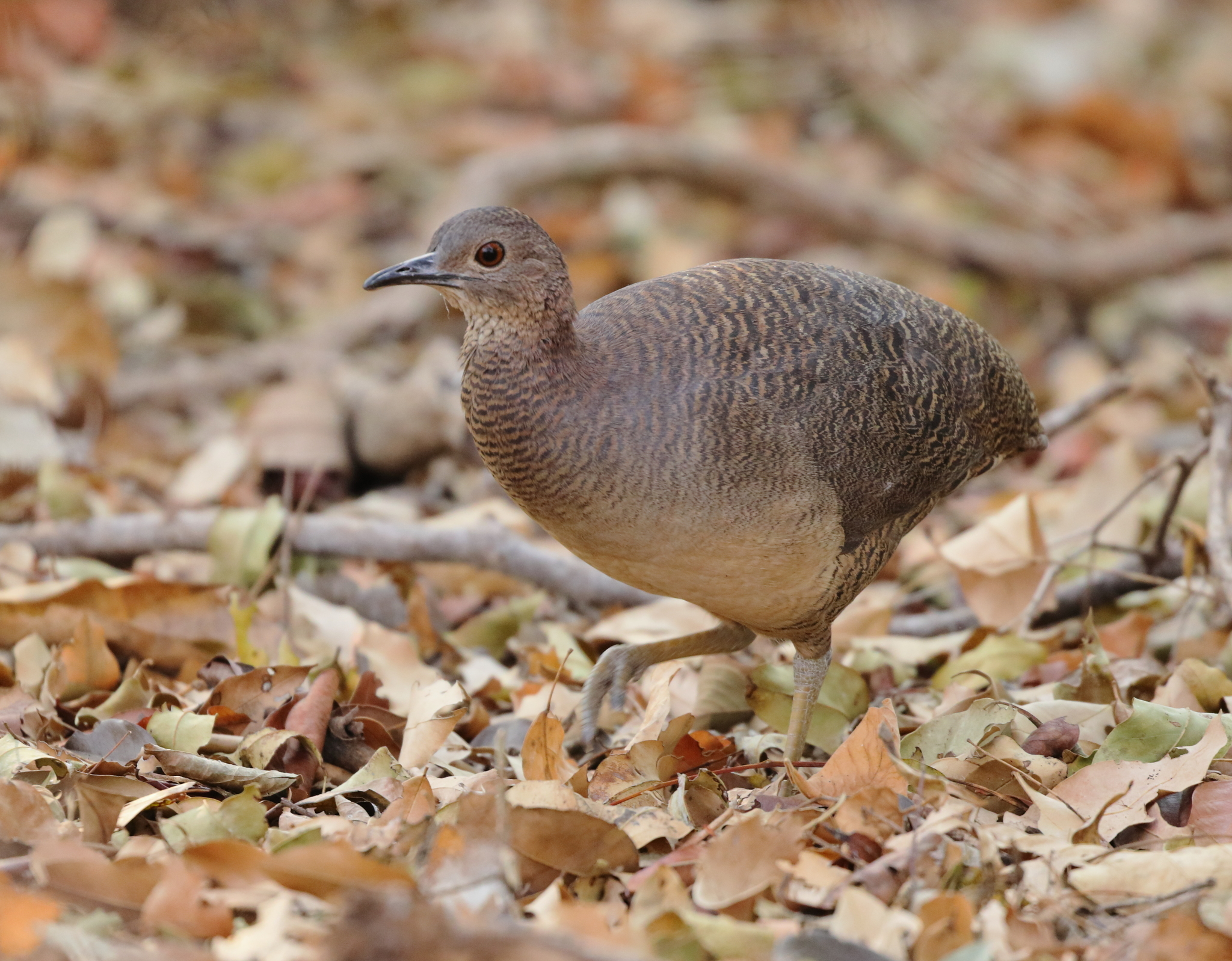
- C. undulatus in Brazil

Conservation status
- Least Concern (IUCN 3.1)

Scientific classification
- Kingdom: Animalia
- Phylum: Chordata
- Class: Aves
- Infraclass: Palaeognathae
- Order: Tinamiformes
- Family: Tinamidae
- Genus: Crypturellus
- Species: C. undulatus

Binomial name
- Crypturellus undulatus (Temminck, 1815)

Subspecies
- C. u. undulatus (Temminck, 1815); C. u. manapiare Phelps & Phelps, 1952; C. u. simplex (Salvadori, 1895); C. u. adspersus (Temminck, 1815); C. u. yapura (Spix, 1825); C. u. vermiculatus (Temminck, 1815)

= Undulated tinamou =

Species of bird

The undulated tinamou (Crypturellus undulatus) is a species of ground bird found in a wide range of wooded habitats in eastern and northern South America.

== Etymology ==
Its generic name Crypturellus is formed from three Latin or Greek words - kruptos meaning "covered" or "hidden", oura meaning "tail", and ellus meaning "diminutive". Therefore, Crypturellus means small, hidden tail. The specific name undulatus originates from the Latin word unda, meaning "wave", and means "furnished with wave-like markings".

== Taxonomy ==
All Crypturellus are in the family Tinamidae, thus are classed as ratites, making them relatives of the cassowary, emu, kiwi, ostrich and rhea. Unlike these larger birds, however, tinamous still have the ability to fly, albeit somewhat weakly and not for prolonged periods (typically flying up, to perch on branches, when fleeing threats). It is thought that all ratites evolved from prehistoric flying birds, hence their distant populations in Australia and Oceania; the tinamou is the closest, smallest living relative of these birds.

=== Subspecies ===
- Crypturellus undulatus manapiare is only known, with certainty, from the vicinity of the Ventuari River in northern Amazonas State, Venezuela, but probably also occurs in SW Amazonas.
- Crypturellus undulatus simplex occurs in southern Guyana, French Guiana (only known from sighting records) and NE Brazil (east of the Rio Negro and north of the Amazon).
- Crypturellus undulatus adspersus occurs in Brazil (south of the Amazon), from the Tapajós to the Madeira River.
- Crypturellus undulatus yapura occurs from SE Colombia, eastern Ecuador, NE and East-Central Perú, and western Brazil (east to Rio Negro and the Purús River).
- Crypturellus undulatus vermiculatus occurs in eastern Brazil, from Maranhão, Tocantins and Mato Grosso and east.
- Crypturellus undulatus undulatus occurs in SE Perú, eastern and northern Bolivia, the Brazilian Pantanal, Paraguay and northern Argentina.

The exact distribution limits of certain subspecies, however, are unclear; notably, the population between the Madeira and Purus Rivers (between the generally-reported range of C. u. adspersus and C. u. yapura) and the population between the Tapajós and Araguaia Rivers (between the generally-reported range of C. u. adspersus and C. u. vermiculatus) appear not to have been assigned to subspecies.

== Description ==
The undulated tinamou is about 28–30 cm (11.0–11.8 in) in length, and weighs around 300 g (0.66 lb). Depending on subspecies, it is overall brownish tinged grey to various extents, and has a strong, black, barred to faint vermiculated pattern on the back and neck (for example, while C. u. undulatus is relatively rich brown and strongly barred, C. u. yapura is darker, more grey-tinged, and only has faint vermiculations). It has a whitish throat, and the remainders of its underparts are olive-grey to buff with dark vermiculation on its lower flanks and vent. Its bill is black above and grey below. The legs and feet are grey, dull yellow, or greenish.

== Behavior ==
The nest of the undulated tinamou consists of a depression on the ground, where the female lays around three glossy vinaceous, pink or light-grey eggs. The incubation time is 17 days in captivity. It feeds on small fruits, seeds and insects.

As other tinamous, the undulated tinamou is secretive, and more frequently heard than seen. The song, commonly given throughout the day, consists of a deep, three- or four-noted whistle, which has been described by the onomatopoetic com-pra pan ("buy bread" in Spanish) or eu sou jaó ("I am undulated tinamou" in Portuguese).

== Habitat ==
The undulated tinamou occurs at altitudes of up to 1,400 m (4,600 ft). It occurs in a wide range of wooded habitats, ranging from dense, humid Amazonian forests, to dry, relatively open savanna-woodland. Although most of the range of the undulated tinamou is in the Amazon Basin, significant parts are in drier habitats such as the Cerrado (most of the range of C. u. vermiculatus is in the Cerrado region). Though generally considered resident, minor seasonal movements between habitats do occur locally.

== Conservation ==
Though heavily hunted in some regions, the undulated tinamou remains common in most parts of its range. The IUCN classifies it as least concern, and its range of occurrence has been estimated to 10,600,000 km^{2} (4,100,000 sq mi).
