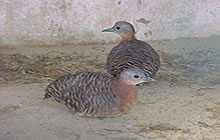
- Voice

Conservation status
- Least Concern (IUCN 3.1)

Scientific classification
- Kingdom: Animalia
- Phylum: Chordata
- Class: Aves
- Infraclass: Palaeognathae
- Order: Tinamiformes
- Family: Tinamidae
- Genus: Crypturellus
- Species: C. variegatus

Binomial name
- Crypturellus variegatus (Gmelin, JF, 1789)

= Variegated tinamou =

Species of bird

The variegated tinamou (Crypturellus variegatus) is a type of tinamou commonly found in moist forest lowlands in subtropical and tropical regions of northern South America.

== Taxonomy ==
The variegated tinamou was formally described in 1789 by the German naturalist Johann Friedrich Gmelin in his revised and expanded edition of Carl Linnaeus's Systema Naturae. He placed it with all the other quail like birds in the genus Tetrao and coined the binomial name Tetrao variegatus. Gmelin based his description on the Le Tinamou varié that had been described in 1778 by the French polymath Georges-Louis Leclerc, Comte de Buffon and also illustrated in a separate publication. The variegated tinamou is now placed with around twenty other tinamou in the genus Crypturellus that was introduced in 1914 by the British ornithologists Baron Brabourne and Charles Chubb. The genus name combines the Ancient Greek κρυπτός (kruptós) meaning "hidden" with οὐρά (oura) meaning "tail". The -ellus is a diminutive so that the name means "small hidden tail". The specific epithet variegatus is Latin meaning "variegated". The cinereous tinamou is monotypic: no subspecies are recognised.

All tinamou are from the family Tinamidae, and in the larger scheme are also ratites. Unlike other ratites, tinamous can fly, although in general, they are not strong fliers. All ratites evolved from prehistoric flying birds, and tinamous are the closest living relative of these birds.

== Description ==
The variegated tinamou is approximately 29.5 to 33 cm (11.6–13.0 in) in length. Its upper back is rufous, and its lower back and wings are black with conspicuous yellowish bands. Its throat is white, and its neck and upper breast are bright rufous, with buff lower breast and belly. Also, its flanks are tinged with cinnamon and dusky light barring. Its crown and sides of head are black with a yellow bill, and greenish to yellowish-brown legs.

They have a call that consists of five tremulous evenly pitched notes, sometimes with the notes merging into a trill, although the first note is always distinct and it descends.

== Distribution and habitat ==
The variegated tinamou lives in humid lowland forests with dense undergrowth in southern and eastern Colombia, southern Venezuela, French Guiana, Suriname, Guyana, Amazonian Brazil, eastern Peru, eastern Ecuador, and northern Bolivia. They prefer an altitude of 100 to 1,300 m (330–4,270 ft).

== Behavior ==
Like other tinamous, the variegated eats fruit off the ground or low-lying bushes. They also eat small amounts of invertebrates, flower buds, tender leaves, seeds, and roots. The male incubates the eggs which may come from as many as 4 different females, and then will raise them until they are ready to be on their own, usually 2–3 weeks. The nest is located on the ground in dense brush or between raised root buttresses.

== Conservation ==
The IUCN lists this tinamou as Least Concern, with an occurrence range of 5,400,000 km^{2} (2,100,000 sq mi).

== Sources ==
- BirdLife International (2008). "Variegated Tinamou - BirdLife Species Factsheet". Data Zone.
- Clements, James (2007). The Clements Checklist of the Birds of the World (6th ed.). Ithaca, NY: Cornell University Press. ISBN 978-0-8014-4501-9.
- Davies, S.J.J.F. (2003). "Tinamous". In Hutchins, Michael (ed.). Grzimek's Animal Life Encyclopedia. Vol. 8 Birds I Tinamous and Ratites to Hoatzins (2nd ed.). Farmington Hills, MI: Gale Group. pp. 57–59, 64. ISBN 0-7876-5784-0.
