= Charles Chubb (ornithologist) =

British ornithologist

Charles Chubb (31 December 1851 – 25 June 1924) was a British ornithologist.

== Family ==
Chubb was born in Steeple Langford near Salisbury, England. He married twice, to Ada Albion and Alice Mabel Baker. He had seven children, among them Ernest Charles Chubb who also became an ornithologist and was a museum curator in Durban.

In 1924, Chubb was knocked down by a car outside the Natural History Museum, London, and died two weeks later in that city.

== Career ==
Chubb began working at the British Museum at the age of 26.

Among the birds he described are Cobb's wren and the tinamou genus Crypturellus.

== Works ==
- The Birds of British Guiana, based on the collection of Frederick Vavasour McConnell (2 volumes, 1916 and 1921)
- The Birds of South America (1912, with Lord Brabourne)
