= Wyndham Knatchbull-Hugessen, 3rd Baron Brabourne =

British peer

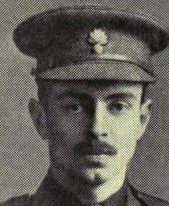
Brabourne in military uniform

Wyndham Wentworth Knatchbull-Hugessen, 3rd Baron Brabourne (21 September 1885 – 11 March 1915) was a British peer. He was killed in action with the Grenadier Guards on 11 March 1915, and is commemorated at Le Touret.

== Life ==
Knatchbull-Hugesson was born 21 September 1885 on at Norton, Kent the son of Edward Knatchbull-Hugessen, 2nd Baron Brabourne.

Knatchbull-Hugesson was commissioned in the Grenadier Guards and joined the 2nd Battalion in 1908. On the death of his father in 1909 he became the 3rd Baron Brabourne. He resigned in 1911 and joined the special reserve of the regiment and rejoined on mobilisation for the First World War.

He was a noted ornithologist and co-wrote 'The Birds of South America' in 1912.

In 1911 he was one of the 112 peers who voted against the passing of the Parliament Act 1911.

Knatchbull-Hugessen was killed in action in France on 11 March 1915, as he never married and had no children he was succeeded by his Uncle Cecil who became the 4th Baron Brabourne.

Peerage of the United Kingdom
| Preceded by Edward Knatchbull-Hugessen | Baron Brabourne; 1909–1915 | Succeeded by Cecil Knatchbull-Hugessen |
