= Dwarf emu =

Dwarf emu, or lesser emu, refers to either of the two small emu types:

- Kangaroo Island emu
- King Island emu
