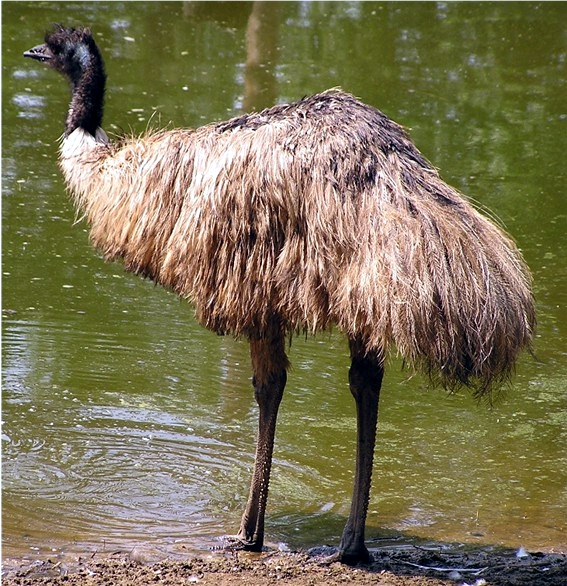
- Dromaius novaehollandiae

Scientific classification
- Kingdom: Animalia
- Phylum: Chordata
- Class: Aves
- Infraclass: Palaeognathae
- Order: Casuariiformes
- Family: Casuariidae
- Genus: Dromaius; Vieillot, 1816

Type species
- Casuarius novaehollandiae Latham, 1790

Species
- D. novaehollandiae (Latham, 1790) Vieillot, 1816 †D. arleyekweke Yates, 2019 †D. ocypus Miller, 1963
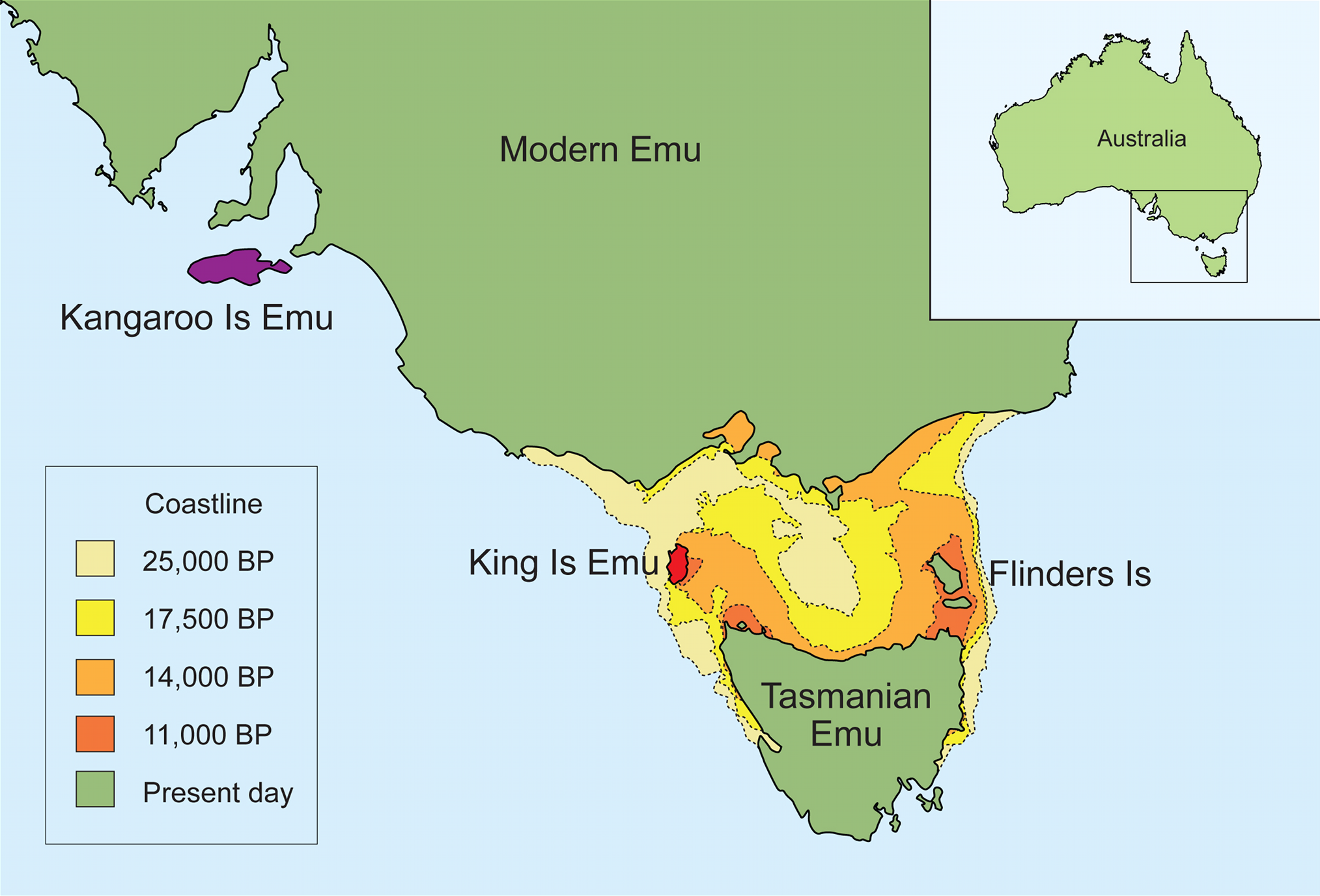
- Geographic distribution of emu taxa and historic shoreline reconstructions around Tasmania

Synonyms
- Dromiceius (sic) Vieillot, 1816; Dromæus (sic) Ranzani, 1821; Dromicejus (sic) Wagler, 1830; Dromiceus (sic) Wagler, 1830; Dromaeus (sic) Agassiz, 1842; Dromajus (sic) Thienemann, 1845; Dromaeius (sic) Bonaparte, 1856; Dromeicus (sic) A. Newton,1893; Emou Griffith & Pidgeon, 1829; Peronista Mathews, 1912; Tachea Fleming, 1822

= Dromaius =

Dromaius Temporal range: Miocene–present

Genus of birds

Dromaius (from Ancient Greek δρομαῖος; "swift one", "runner") is a genus of ratite present in Australia. There is one extant species, Dromaius novaehollandiae, commonly known as the emu.

In his original 1816 description of the emu, Louis Pierre Vieillot used two generic names; first Dromiceius, then Dromaius a few pages later. Which label is correct has been a point of contention ever since; the latter is more correctly formed, but the convention in taxonomy is that the first name given stands, unless it is clearly a typographical error, as argued by W.B. Alexander. For names published on the same day, or in the same publication, the International Code of Zoological Nomenclature states that both names have equal precedence, and that the Principle of First Reviser (Article 24.2) determines which name is to be used. Most modern publications, including those of the Australian government, use Dromaius, with Dromiceius mentioned as an alternative spelling. Misspellings of both forms by later authors have produced further synonyms. The Dromiceius spelling was the basis for Dale Russell's 1972 naming of the dinosaur Dromiceiomimus.

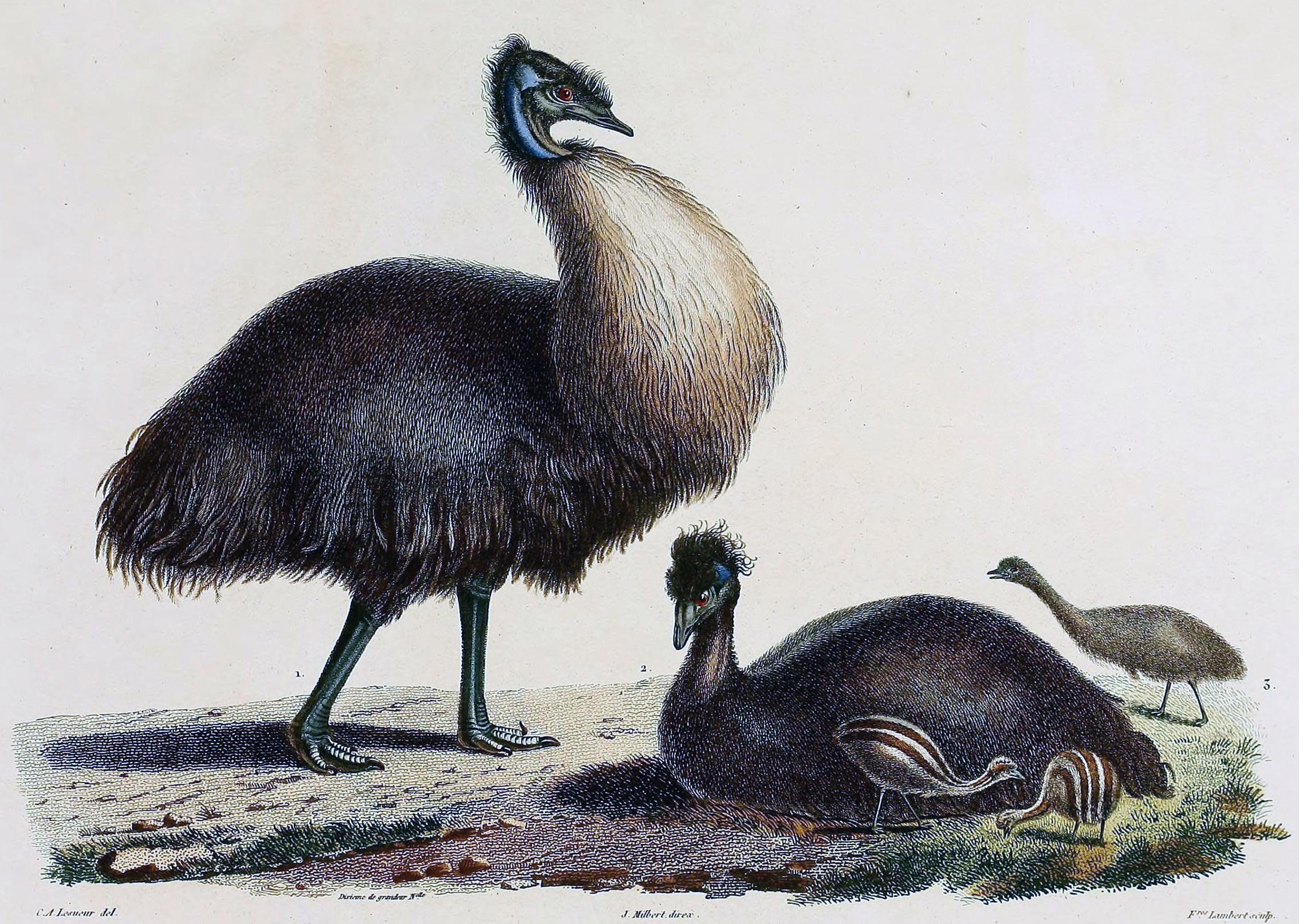
Illustration by Charles-Alexandre Lesueur, based on life-drawings made during Baudin's journey and specimens kept at Jardin des Plantes. The animals were thought to be a male and female of the same species, but are now believed to be a Kangaroo Island emu and King Island emu

== Species and subspecies ==
The following species and subspecies are recognized:

- Dromaius novaehollandiae, emu, remains common in most of the more lightly settled parts of mainland Australia. Overall population varies from decade to decade according to rainfall; as low as 200,000 and as high as 1,000,000, but a typical figure is about half a million individuals. Although emus are no longer found in the densely settled southern and southwestern agricultural areas, the provision of permanent stock water in arid regions has allowed the mainland subspecies to extend its range. There are five recognised subspecies or races of the emu:
  - Dromaius novaehollandiae novaehollandiae – Southeastern Australia – whitish ruff when breeding.
  - Dromaius novaehollandiae woodwardi – Northern Australia – slender, paler (not recognised as a subspecies by all authorities).
  - Dromaius novaehollandiae rothschildi – Southwestern Australia – darker, no ruff during breeding (not recognised as a subspecies by all authorities).
  - †Dromaius novaehollandiae diemenensis – Tasmania – The Tasmanian emu, which became extinct around 1850.
  - †Dromaius novaehollandiae minor – King Island – The King Island emu was about half the size of the mainland species. By 1805 it had been hunted to extinction by sealers and visiting sailors. Some individuals were kept in captivity in Paris, the last one dying in 1822. Vieillot coined the name Dromaius ater, but in his 1907 book Extinct Birds, Walter Rothschild stated that Vieillot's description actually referred to the mainland emu and that the name D. ater was therefore invalid. It was thought to be a distinct species until 2011.
  - †Dromaius novaehollandiae baudinianus - Kangaroo Island - The Kangaroo Island emu became extinct around 1827 as a result of hunting and frequent fires. The larger mainland subspecies was introduced to Kangaroo Island in the 1920s.
- †Dromaius ocypus, a prehistoric species of emu, described from Late Pliocene fossils (Mampuwordu Sands Formation, Lake Palankarinna, Australia), currently accepted as distinct.
- †Dromaius arleyekweke, a diminutive species of emu, known from dispersed skeletal elements from the Miocene Waite Formation (Northern Territory, Australia)

A number of other emu fossils from Australia described as separate species are now regarded as chronosubspecies at best, given the considerable variation even between living individuals. There are also some unidentifiable remains of emu-like birds from rocks as old as the middle Miocene.
