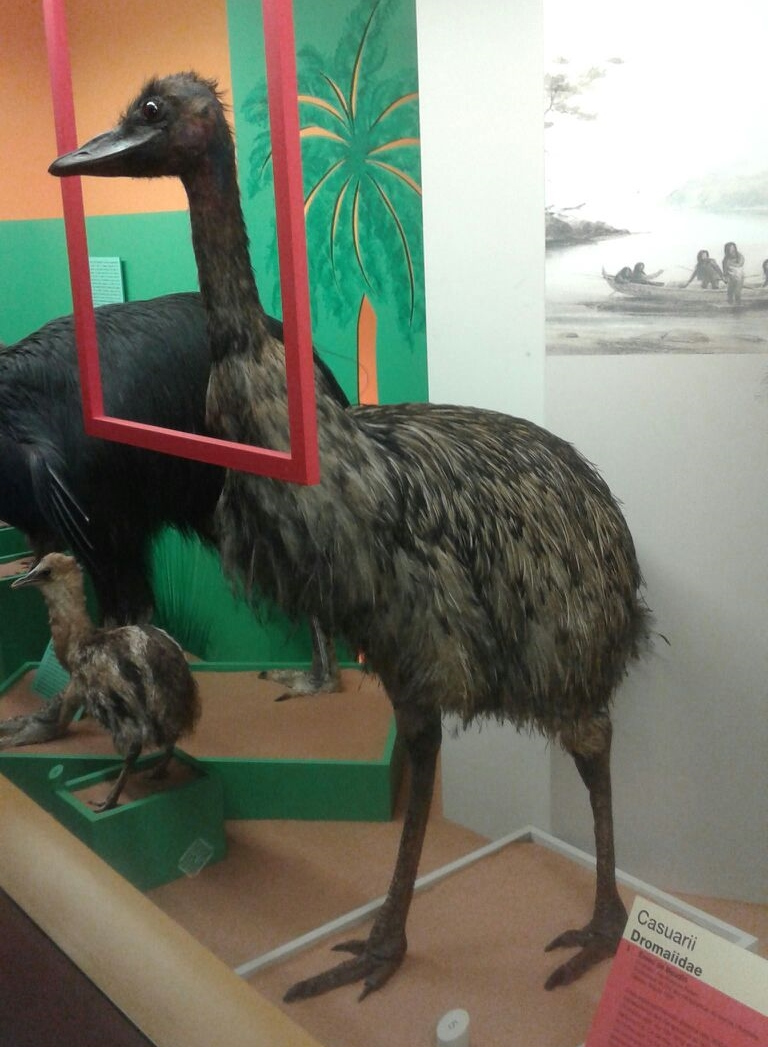
- Only known skin, Natural History Museum of Geneva

Conservation status
- Extinct (1827) (IUCN 3.1)

Scientific classification
- Kingdom: Animalia
- Phylum: Chordata
- Class: Aves
- Infraclass: Palaeognathae
- Order: Casuariiformes
- Family: Casuariidae
- Genus: Dromaius
- Species: D. novaehollandiae
- Subspecies: †D. n. baudinianus

Trinomial name
- †Dromaius novaehollandiae baudinianus Parker, S.A., 1984
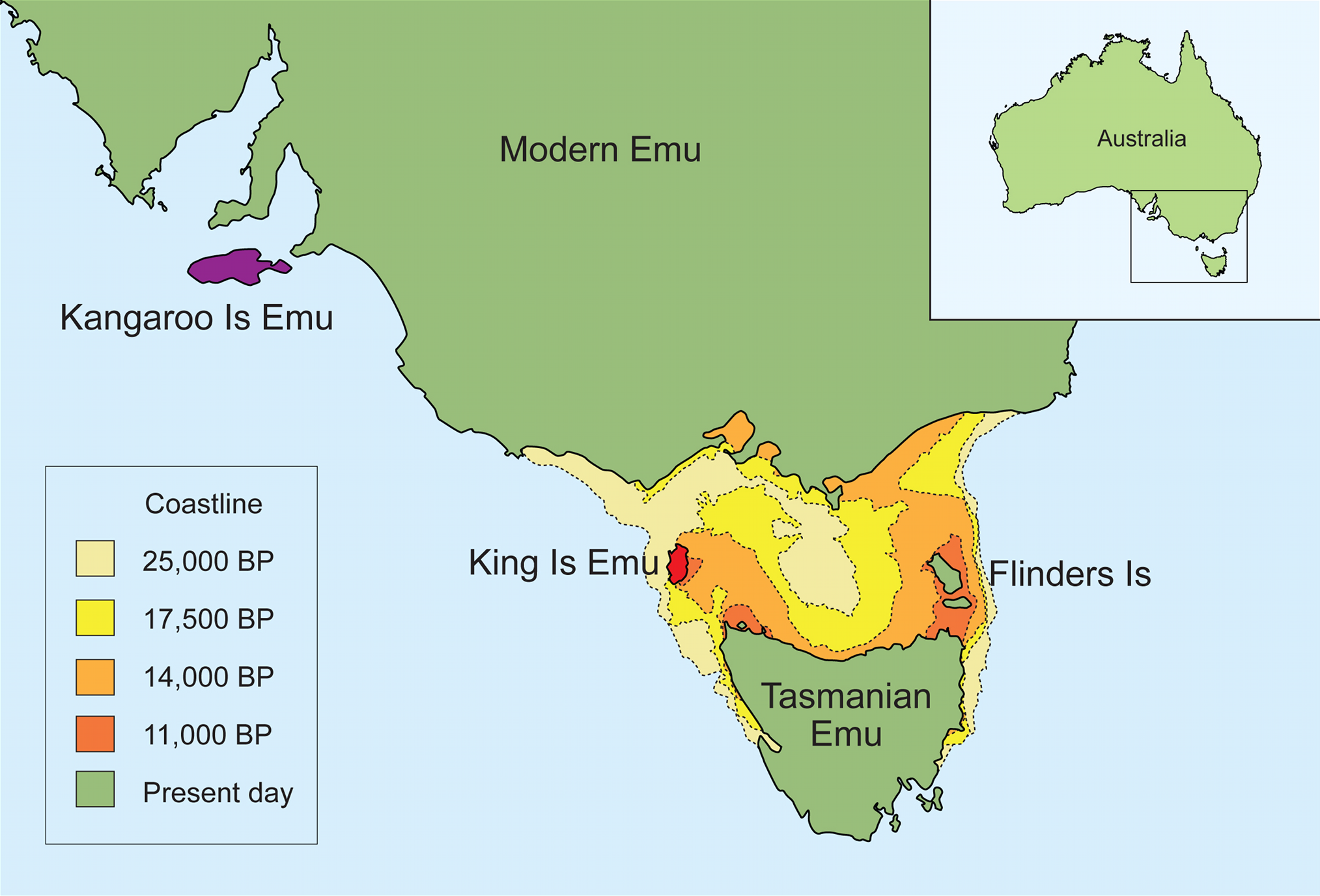
- Geographic distribution of emu taxa and historic shoreline reconstructions around Tasmania, D. n. baudinianus in purple

Synonyms
- Casuarius diemenianus Jennings,1827; Dromaius parvulus Mathews,1901; Peronista diemenianus Mathews,1927

= Kangaroo Island emu =

Extinct subspecies of bird

The Kangaroo Island emu or dwarf emu (Dromaius novaehollandiae baudinianus) is an extinct subspecies of emu. It was restricted to Kangaroo Island, South Australia, which was known as Ile Decrés by the members of the Baudin expedition. It differed from the mainland emu mainly in its smaller size. The subspecies became extinct by about 1827.

== Taxonomy ==
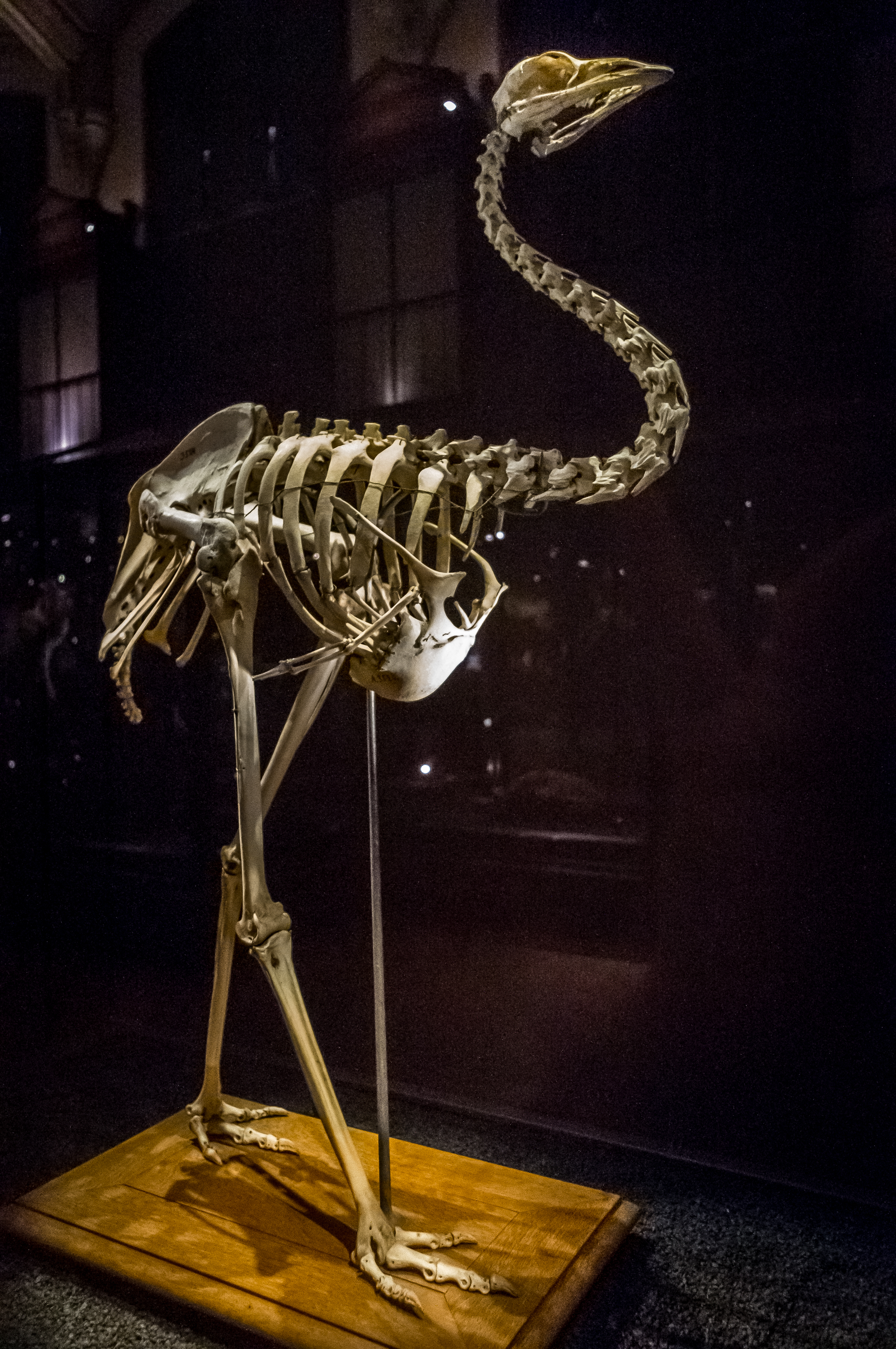
Only known skeleton, Jardin des plantes, Paris

It was first recorded in 1802 by Matthew Flinders and reported to be quite common around Nepean Bay. The first bones of the subspecies were discovered in 1903 at The Brecknells, sandhills on the west side of Cape Gantheaume. Initially, there was confusion regarding the taxonomic status and geographic origin of the Kangaroo Island emu, particularly with respect to their relationship to the King Island emu, which were also transported to France as part of the same expedition. The expeditions logbooks failed to clearly state where and when dwarf emu individuals were collected. This led to both taxa being interpreted as a single taxon and that it originated from Kangaroo Island. More recent finds of subfossil material and subsequent studies on King and Kangaroo Island emu confirm their separate geographic origin and distinct morphology.

In his 1907 book Extinct Birds, Walter Rothschild claimed Vieillot's description actually referred to the mainland emu, and that the name D. ater was therefore preoccupied. Believing the skin in Muséum national d'Histoire naturelle of Paris was from Kangaroo Island, he made it the type specimen of his new species Dromaius peroni, named after the French naturalist François Péron, who is the main source of information about the bird in life. The Australian amateur ornithologist Gregory Mathews coined further names in the early 1910s, including a new genus name, Peronista, as he believed the King and Kangaroo Island birds were generically distinct from the mainland emu. Later writers claimed that the subfossil remains found on King and Kangaroo Islands were not discernibly different, and that they therefore belonged to the same taxon. In 1959, the French ornithologist Christian Jouanin proposed that none of the skins were actually from Kangaroo Island. In 1990, Jouanin and Jean-Christophe Balouet demonstrated that the mounted skin in Paris came from King Island, and that at least one live bird had been brought from each island. All scientific names given to the Kangaroo Island emu were therefore based on specimens from King Island or were otherwise invalid, leaving it nameless. More recent finds of sub-fossil material and subsequent studies on the King and Kangaroo Island emus, notably by Shane A. Parker in 1984, confirmed their separate geographic origin and distinct morphology. Parker named the Kangaroo Island bird Dromaius baudinianus, after the leader of the French expedition. He based it on a subfossil specimen from Kangaroo Island, South Australia. Specimen SAM B689Ib, a left tarsometatarsus, is the holotype.

The subspecies is known from historical observer accounts and from bones, including sets deposited at the South Australian Museum. The mounted skin that can be seen at the Natural History Museum of Geneva in Switzerland and the skeleton exhibited in the Natural History Museum of Paris belong to the same individual. The Geneva specimen is thus the only skin left of this taxon.

It is believed that this emu lived in the interior forest.

The subspecies' extinction has been attributed to hunting and habitat clearance through burning.

== Relationship with humans ==
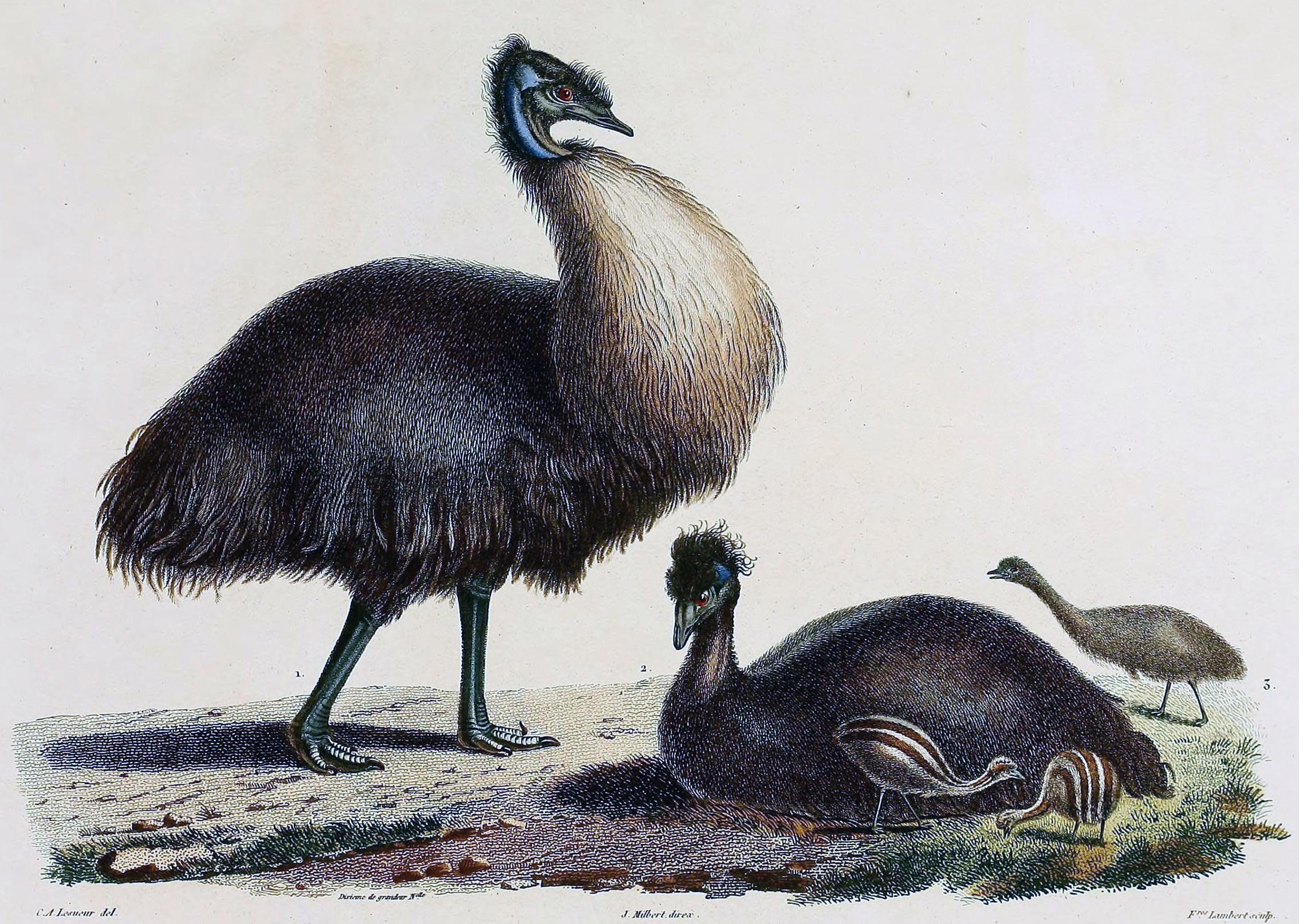
Illustration by Charles-Alexandre Lesueur, based on life-drawings made during Baudin's journey and specimens kept at Jardin des Plantes. The animals were thought to be a male and female of the same subspecies, but are possibly a Kangaroo Island emu and a King Island emu.

Several emu specimens belonging to the different subspecies were sent to France, both alive and dead, as part of the expedition. Some of these are in European museums today. Le Naturaliste brought one live specimen and one skin of the mainland emu to France in June 1803. Le Géographe collected emus from both King and Kangaroo Island, and at least two live King Island individuals, assumed to be a male and female by some sources, were taken to France in March 1804. This ship also brought skins of five juveniles collected from different islands. Two of these skins, of which the provenance is unknown, are presently kept in Paris and Turin; the rest are lost.

Peron's 1807, three-volume account of the expedition, Voyage de découverte aux terres Australes, contains an illustration (plate 36) of "casoars" by Charles-Alexandre Lesueur, who was the resident artist during Baudin's voyage. The caption states the birds shown are from "Ile Decrès", the French name for Kangaroo Island, but there is confusion over what is actually depicted. The two adult birds are labelled as a male and female of the same subspecies, surrounded by juveniles. The family-group shown is improbable, since breeding pairs of the mainland emu split up once the male begins incubating the eggs. Lesueur's preparatory sketches also indicate these may have been drawn after the captive birds in Jardin des Plantes, and not wild ones, which would have been harder to observe for extended periods.

The Australian museum curator, Stephanie Pfennigwerth, has instead proposed that the larger "male" was actually drawn after a captive Kangaroo Island emu, that the smaller, dark "female" is a captive King Island emu, that the scenario is fictitious, and the sexes of the birds indeterminable. They may instead only have been assumed to be male and female of the same subspecies due to their difference in size. A crooked claw on the "male" has also been interpreted as evidence that it had lived in captivity, and it may also indicate that the depicted specimen is identical to the Kangaroo Island emu skeleton in Paris, which has a deformed toe. The juvenile on the right may have been based on the Paris skin of an approximately five-month-old King Island emu specimen, which may, in turn, be the individual that died on board le Geographe during rough weather, and was presumably stuffed there by Lesueur himself. The chicks may instead simply have been based on those of mainland emus, as none are known to have been collected.
