= Extinct Birds =

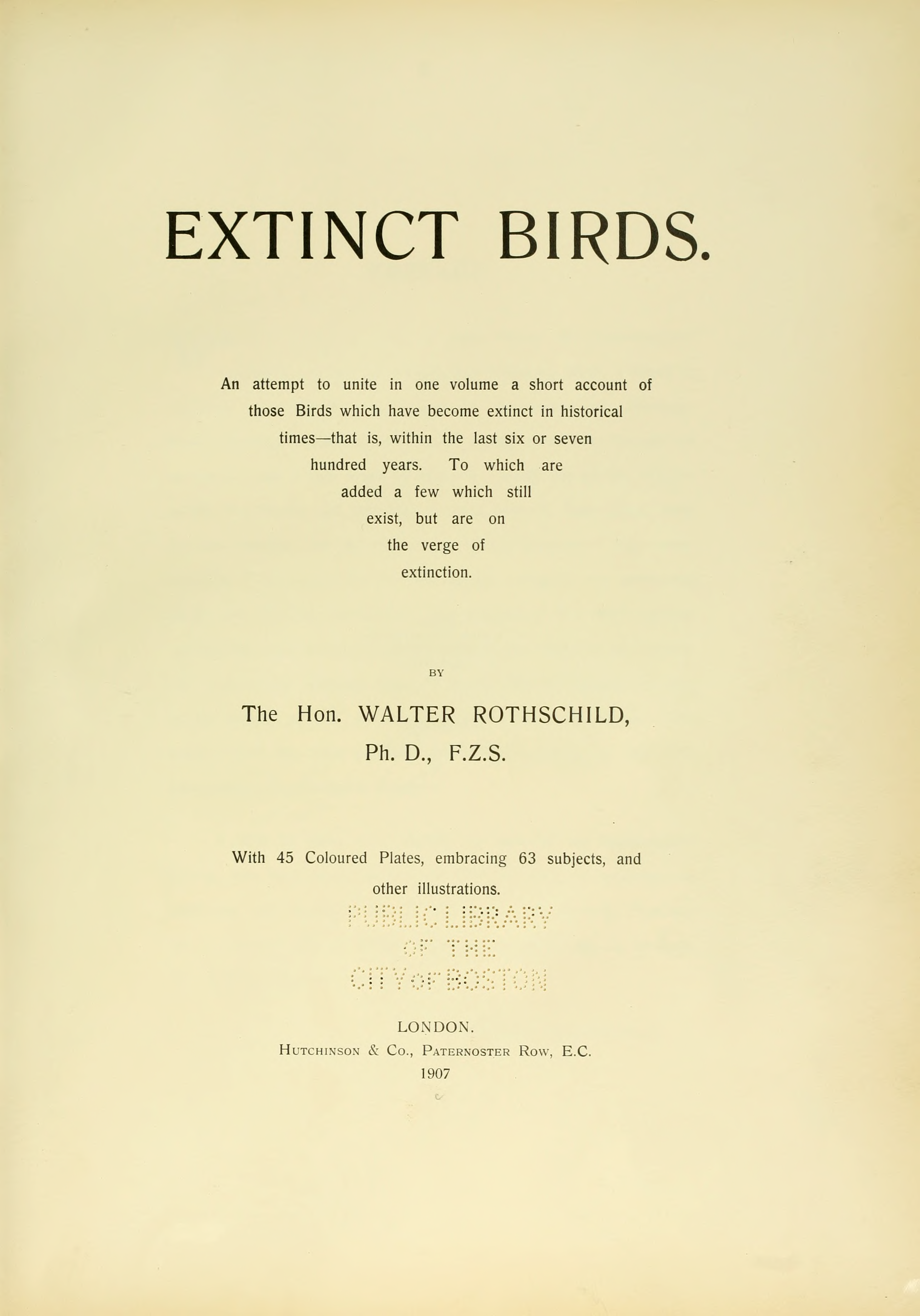
- Title page
- Author: The Hon. Walter Rothschild
- Illustrator: See text
- Language: English
- Subject: Extinct birds
- Genre: Zoology
- Publisher: Hutchinson & Co.: London
- Publication date: 1907
- Publication place: United Kingdom
- Media type: Print (hardcover)

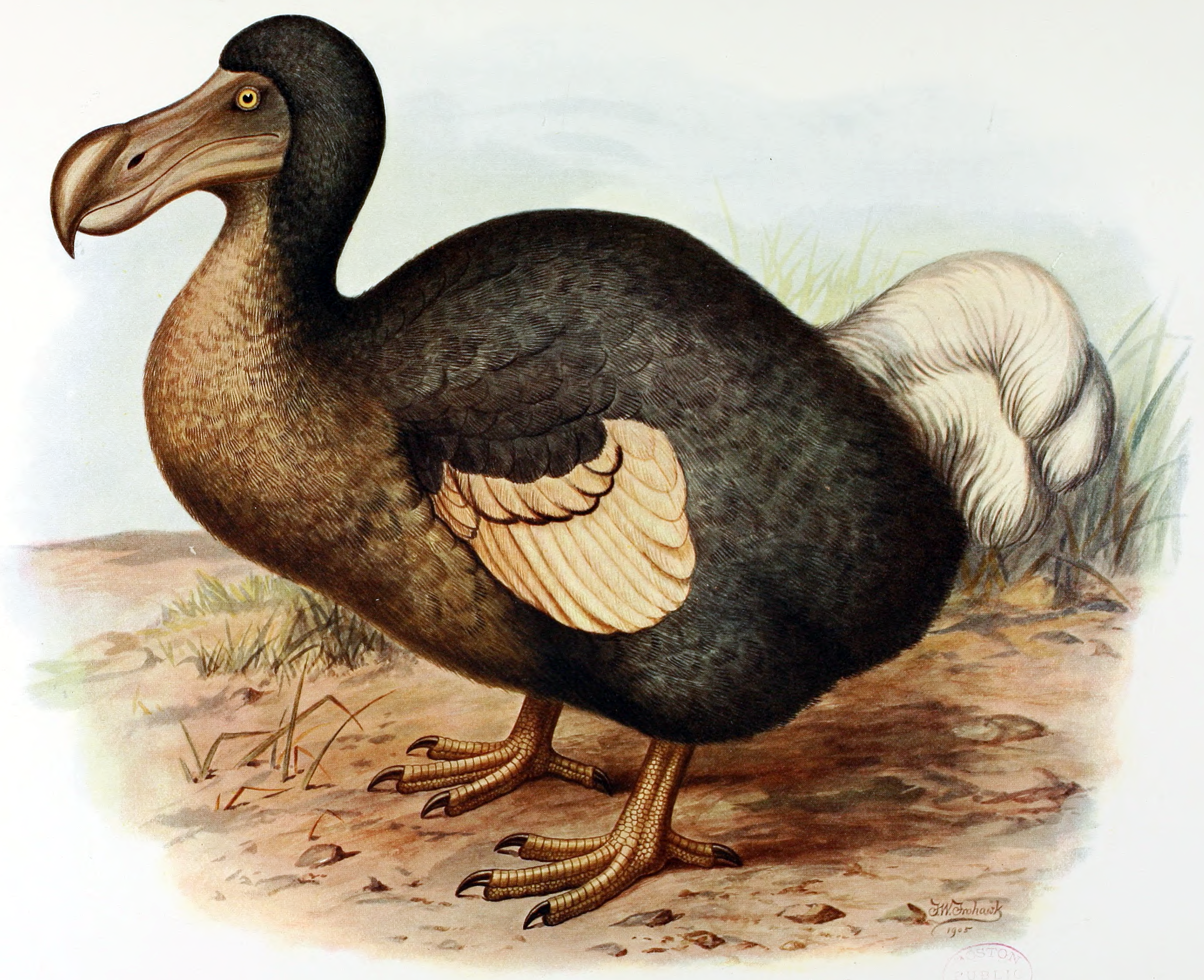
Frederick William Frohawk's restoration of the extinct dodo.

Extinct Birds (complete title: Extinct birds. An attempt to unite in one volume a short account of those Birds which have become extinct in historical times—that is, within the last six or seven hundred years. To which are added a few which still exist, but are on the verge of extinction.) is a book by Walter Rothschild which covers globally extinct and rare birds, as well as hypothetical extinct species which include bird taxa whose existence is based only on written or oral reports or on paintings. The accounts of the extinct bird taxa are based on Rothschild's lecture On extinct and vanishing birds published in the Proceedings of the 4th International Ornithological Congress 1905 in London.

Subsequent authors like Errol Fuller were influenced by Rothschild's reference work. Fuller published an eponymous book in 1987 with a foreword written by Miriam Rothschild and also used color plates from Rothschild's work.

== Limited number ==
Only 300 copies were published in 1907 at Hutchinson and Co. in London. All copies were registered and personally signed by Rothschild.

== Plates ==
The 45 color paintings and four grayscale sketches are by John Gerrard Keulemans, George Edward Lodge, Henrik Grönvold, Frederick William Frohawk and Joseph Smit.
