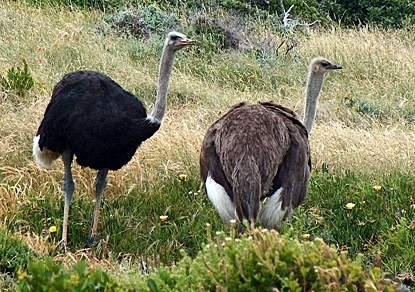
- Ostrich (Struthio camelus)

Scientific classification
- Kingdom: Animalia
- Phylum: Chordata
- Class: Aves
- Infraclass: Palaeognathae
- Order: Struthioniformes; Latham, 1790

= List of ratites =

Ratites Temporal range: Paleocene-Holocene 56–0 Ma Possible Late Cretaceous record

This is a list of ratites.

== Codes used in Status columns in tables below ==
- Extinct (EX) – No known living individuals
- Extinct in the wild (EW) – Known only to survive in captivity, or as a naturalized population outside its historic range
- Critically endangered (CR) – Extremely high risk of extinction in the wild
- Endangered (EN) – Higher risk of extinction in the wild
- Vulnerable (VU) – High risk of extinction in the wild
- Near threatened (NT) – Likely to become endangered in the near future
- Conservation Dependent (CD) – Low risk; is conserved to prevent being near threatened, certain events may lead it to being a higher risk level
- Least concern (LC) – Very Low risk; does not qualify for a higher risk category and not likely to be threatened in the near future. Widespread and abundant taxa are included in this category.

== Struthionidae ==
=== Struthio ===
Name	Binomial Name	Status	Distribution
Common ostrich	Struthio camelus	LR/lc	Through central and southern Africa, four subspecies are recognized
Somali ostrich	Struthio molybdophanes	VU	Native to the Horn of Africa

== Rheidae ==
=== Rhea ===
Name	Binomial Name	Status	Distribution
Greater rhea	Rhea americana	LR/nt	South American pampas
Lesser rhea	Rhea pennata	LR/nt	Population in Chile and in Argentina

== Apterygidae ==
=== Apteryx ===
Name	Binomial Name	Status	Distribution
Great spotted kiwi	Apteryx haastii	VU	South Island, New Zealand
Little spotted kiwi	Apteryx owenii	LR/nt	Multiple small islands in New Zealand
Okarito kiwi	Apteryx rowi	CD	Okarito forest in New Zealand's South Island
Southern brown kiwi	Apteryx australis	VU	A small population in the South Island and another on Stewart Island in New Zealand
North Island brown kiwi	Apteryx mantelli	EN	Scattered through New Zealand's North Island

== Dinornithidae ==
=== Dinornis ===
Name	Binomial Name	Status	Distribution
North Island giant moa	Dinornis novaezealdniae	EX	lived in the lowlands of New Zealand's North and South Islands
South Island giant moa	Dinornis robustus	EX	lived in lowlands of New Zealand's South Island

=== Megalapteryx ===
Name	Binomial Name	Status	Distribution
Upland moa	Megalapteryx didinus	EX	South Island mountains, New Zealand

=== Anomalopteryx ===
Name	Binomial Name	Status	Distribution
Bush moa	Anomalopteryx didiformis	EX	lived in lowland conifers in New Zealand's North Island, and small spots in the South Island

=== Euryapteryx ===
Name	Binomial Name	Status	Distribution
Broad-billed Moa	Euryapteryx curtus	EX	lived on lowlands of New Zealand's North, South, and Stewart Islands

=== Emeus ===
Name	Binomial Name	Status	Distribution
Eastern moa	Emeus crassus	EX	lived in lowlands of New Zealand's South Island

=== Pachyornis ===
Name	Binomial Name	Status	Distribution
Heavy-footed Moa	Pachyornis elephantopus	EX	lived in lowlands of New Zealand's South Island
Mantell's moa	Pachyornis geranoides	EX	lived in lowlands of New Zealand's North, South, and Stewart Islands
Crested Moa	Pachyornis australis	EX	dominant moa of far north and far south of New Zealand's South Island

== Dromaiidae ==
=== Dromaius ===
Name	Binomial Name	Status	Distribution
Emu	Dromaius novaehollandiae	LR/lc	Widespread throughout Australia

== Casuariidae ==
=== Casuarius ===
Name	Binomial Name	Status	Distribution
Pygmy cassowary	Casuarius lydekki	EX	
Southern cassowary	Casuarius casuarius	VU	northern Queensland, Australia, Papua New Guinea, and Eastern Indonesia
Northern cassowary	Casuaraius unappendiculatus	VU	Northern Papua New Guinea and East Timor
Dwarf cassowary	Casuarius bennetti	LR/lc	Central East Timor and Papua New Guinea

== Aepyornithidae ==
=== Aepyornis ===
Name	Species	Status	Distribution
Giant elephant bird	Aepyornis maximus	EX	Madagascar
Hildebrandt's elephant bird	Aepyornis hildebrandti	EX	Madagascar

=== Mullerornis ===
Name	Species	Status	Distribution
Lesser elephant bird	Mullerornis modestus	EX	Madagascar
