= Diogenornis =

Diogenornis Temporal range: Middle Paleocene-Early Eocene (Riochican-Casamayoran) ~57–48.6 Ma

Scientific classification
- Kingdom: Animalia
- Phylum: Chordata
- Class: Aves
- Infraclass: Palaeognathae
- Order: Casuariiformes
- Genus: †Diogenornis; Alvarenga 1983

Type species
- †Diogenornis fragilis Alvarenga 1983

Extinct genus of birds

Diogenornis is an extinct genus of ratites, that lived from the Middle Paleocene to the Early Eocene (Riochican to Casamayoran in the SALMA classification). It was described in 1983 by Brazilian scientist Herculano Marcos Ferraz de Alvarenga based on fossils found in the Itaboraí Formation in southeastern Brazil. The type species is D. fragilis. It grew to about two thirds the size of the modern greater rhea, at about 90 centimetres (3.0 ft) of height.

== Description ==
While initially considered a member of the family Opisthodactylidae, further examination of the fossil remains showed that it was more similar to the modern rhea. According to Gerald Mayr, Diogenornis is best considered a stem-group member of the Rheidae. However, recent phylogenetic studies have shown a closer affiliation to Australian ratites, the cassowaries and emus. This may reevaluate the origins and distribution of this clade, expanding their range to the South American Paleocene, well before the appearance of Emuarius. Recent findings nonetheless show that it co-existed with early rheas, meaning the ratite diversity of South America was very high during the Paleogene.

Diogenornis possesses a rather narrow beak, similar to that of tinamous, lithornithids and cassowaries, as well as rather large wings. These traits, both rather unspecialised, seem to suggest a then recent development from a flying ancestor.
