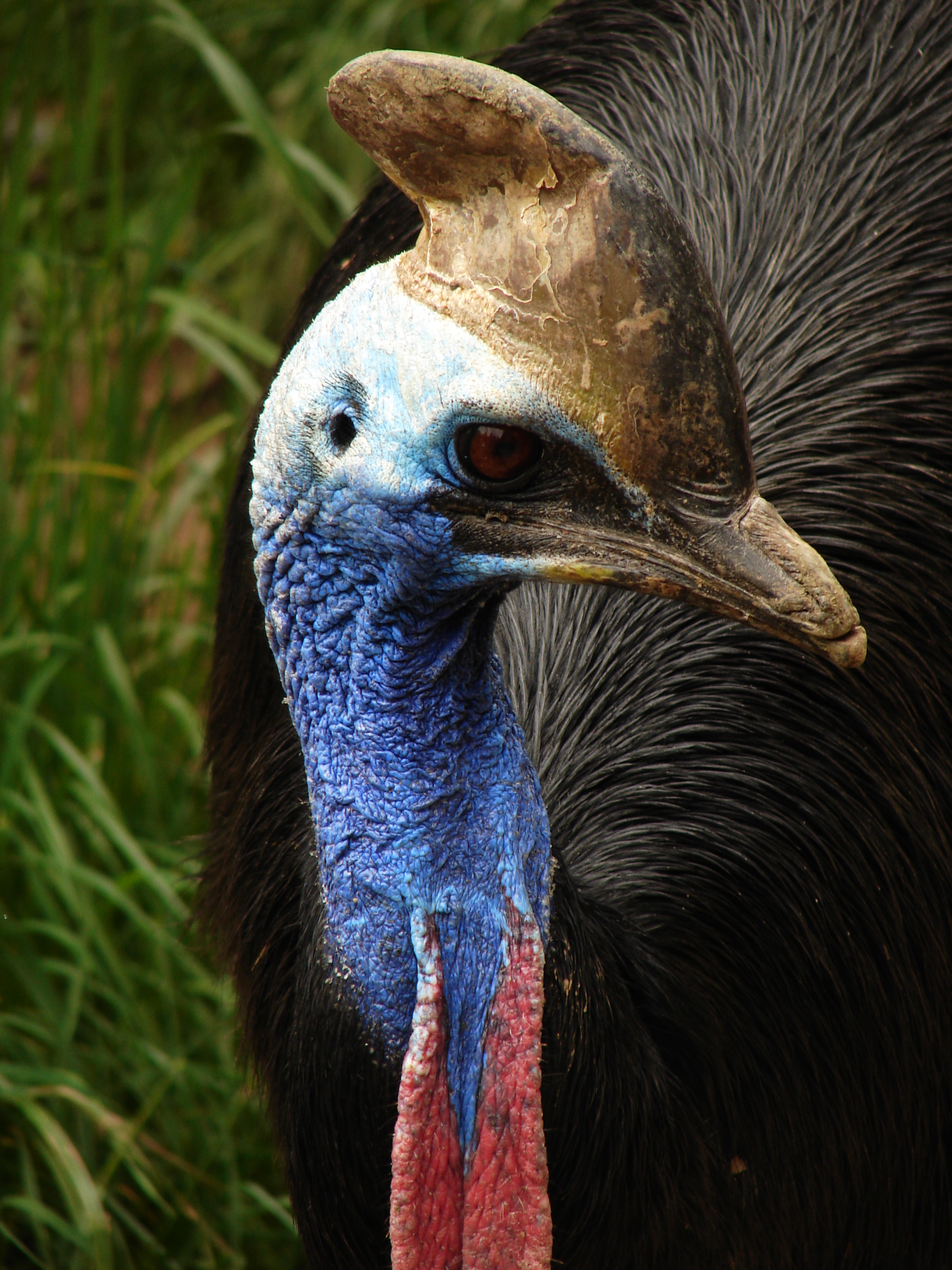
- Southern cassowary

Scientific classification
- Kingdom: Animalia
- Phylum: Chordata
- Class: Aves
- Infraclass: Palaeognathae
- Clade: Novaeratitae
- Order: Casuariiformes (Sclater, 1880) Forbes, 1884

Families
- Casuariidae

Diversity
- 1 family, 4 genera (including 2 extinct), 9 species (including 5 extinct)

Synonyms
- Casuarii Sclater, 1880

= Casuariiformes =

Casuariiformes Temporal range: Miocene–present Possible Paleocene appearance.

Order of birds

The Casuariiformes /kæsjuːˈæri.ɪfɔːrmiːz/ is an order of large flightless birds that has four surviving members: the three species of cassowary, and the only remaining species of emu. All four are placed in a single family, Casuariidae.

All four living members are native to Australia-New Guinea, but some possible extinct taxa occurred in other landmasses.

== Systematics and evolution ==
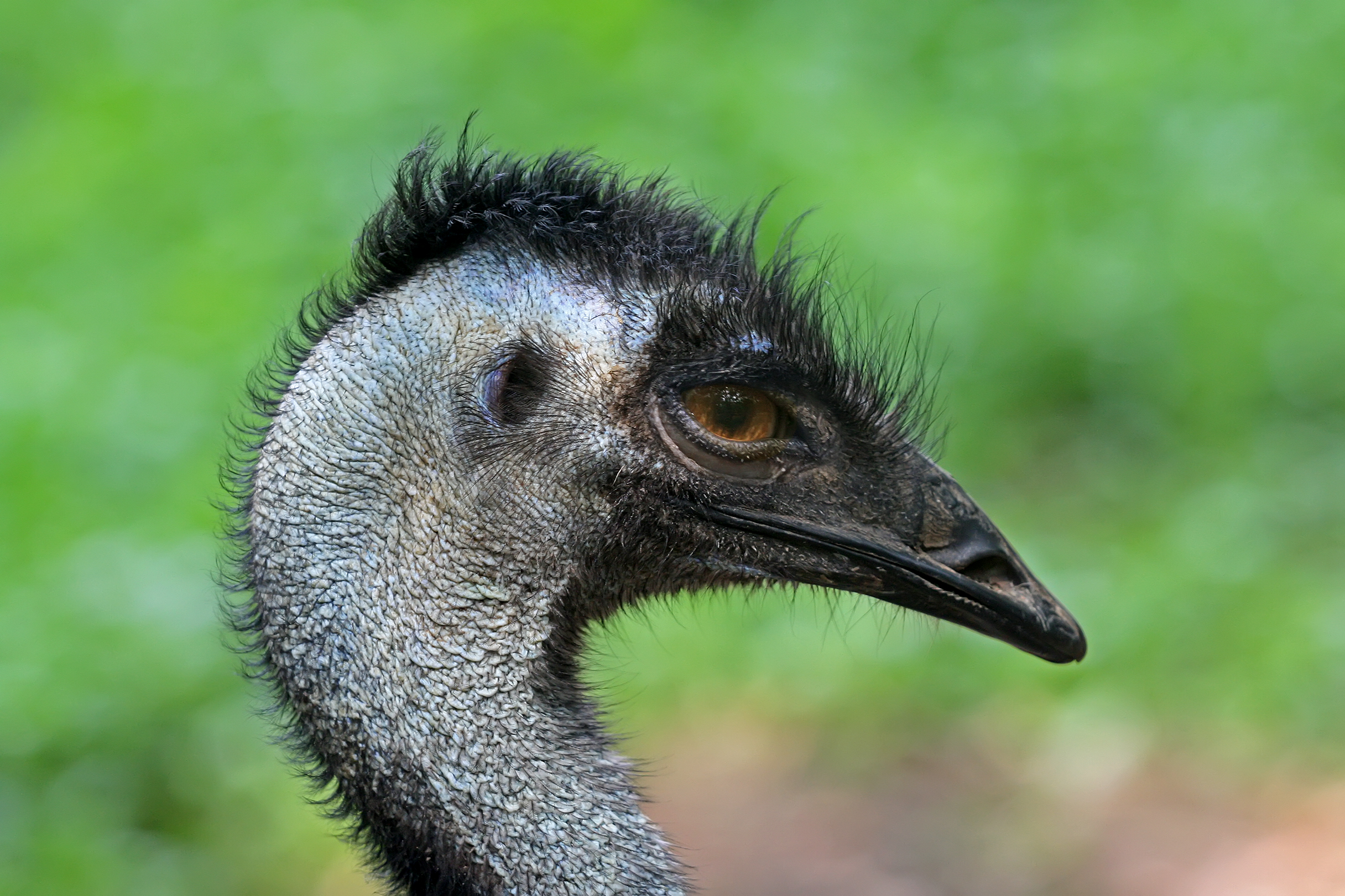
Emu

The emus form a distinct branch, characterized by legs adapted for running. The total number of cassowary species described, based on minor differences in casque shape and color variations, formerly reached nine. Now, however, only three species are recognized, and most authorities only acknowledge few subspecies or none at all.

Some Australian fossils initially believed to be from emus were recognized to represent a distinct genus, Emuarius, (Note: "Emuarius" is from "Emu" + "Casuarius". Describer W.E. Boles commonly refers to the genus as "emuwaries" or "cassomus".) which had a cassowary-like skull and femur and an emu-like lower leg and foot. In addition, the first fossils of mihirungs were initially believed to be from giant emus, (Note: The vernacular name "mihirung" is derived from mihirung paringmal, which means "giant emu" in the Chaap Wuurong language.) but these birds were completely unrelated.

It has been suggested that the South American genus Diogenornis was a casuariiform bird, instead of a member of the rheas, the current South American lineage of giant ground birds. If this were the case, not only would it extend the fossil range of this lineage to a wider region, but to a broader time span as well, since Diogenornis occurs in the late Paleocene and is among the earliest known ratites. In the late 19th century, a fossil casuariid (Hypselornis) was named from India based on a single toe bone, however it was later shown to belong to a crocodilian.

A question regarding this order is whether emus or cassowaries are the more primitive form, if either. Emus are generally assumed to retain more ancestral features, in part because of their more modest coloration, but this does not necessarily have to be the case. The casuariiform fossil record is ambiguous, and the present knowledge of their genome is insufficient for comprehensive analysis. Resolving the cladistic issues will require combination of all these approaches, with at least the additional consideration of plate tectonics.

== Taxonomy ==
Casuariiformes (Sclater, 1880) Forbes 1884

- ?†Diogenornis Alvarenga, 1983 (Paleocene of Brazil)
  - †Diogenornis fragilis Alvarenga, 1983
- Casuariidae Kaup, 1847 (emus and cassowaries)
  - †Emuarius Boles, 1992 (emuwaries) (Late Oligocene – Late Miocene)
    - †Emuarius gidju (Patterson & Rich 1987) Boles, 1992
    - †Emuarius guljaruba Boles, 2001
  - Casuarius (Linnaeus 1758) Brisson, 1760 (cassowary)
    - †Casuarius lydekkeri Rothschild, 1911 (Pygmy cassowary)
    - Casuarius casuarius (Linnaeus, 1758) Brisson, 1760 (Southern cassowary)
    - Casuarius unappendiculatus Blyth 1860 (Northern cassowary)
    - Casuarius bennetti Gould, 1857 (Dwarf cassowary)
  - Dromaius Vieillot, 1816 (modern emus) (Middle Miocene – Recent)
    - †Dromaius arleyekweke Yates & Worthy, 2019
    - †Dromaius ocypus Miller, 1963
    - Dromaius novaehollandiae (Latham, 1790) Vieillot 1816 (emu)
      - †D. n. minor Spencer, 1906 (King Island/black emu)
      - †D. n. baudinianus Parker, 1984 (Kangaroo Island/dwarf emu)
      - †D. n. diemenensis (Jennings, 1827) Le Souef, 1907 (Tasmanian emu)
      - D. n. novaehollandiae (Latham, 1790) (Australian emu)

== Summary of extant species ==
The IOC World Bird List (version 15.1) recognizes 4 species of Casuariiformes. As of December 2025, IUCN/BirdLife International has assessed all species within the order, and three of four have population estimates.

Common name	Binomial name	Population	Status	Trend	Image
Dwarf cassowary	Casuarius bennetti	unknown	LC	▼	
Northern cassowary	Casuarius unappendiculatus	10,000-19,999	LC	▼	
Southern cassowary	Casuarius casuarius	20,000-49,999	LC	▼	
Common emu (Emu)	Dromaius novaehollandiae	630,000-725,000	LC	Steady	
