= Hypselornis =

Hypselornis Temporal range: Late Pliocene

Scientific classification
- Kingdom: Animalia
- Phylum: Chordata
- Class: Reptilia
- Clade: Archosauria
- Order: Crocodilia
- Genus: †Hypselornis; Lydekker, 1891
- Species: †H. sivalensis

Binomial name
- †Hypselornis sivalensis Lydekker, 1891

Genus of fossil crocodilian

Hypselornis is an extinct genus of fossil reptile, most likely a crocodilian, from the late Pliocene of India. Known only from a single toe bone, Hypselornis was originally mistakenly identified as a ratite bird related to the living cassowary before being re-identified as belonging to a large reptile, probably a crocodilian.

== Discovery and naming ==
The holotype specimen of Hypselornis (no. 39733) was found in the late Pliocene aged Siwalik Hills of northern India, and was collected by Proby Cautley who presented it to the Natural History Museum in London. This specimen consists of a single toe bone (phalanx), and was initially mistakenly thought to have been referred to Struthio asiaticus by Richard Lydekker in 1879. This mistake was corrected by palaeontologist William Davies in 1880, who concluded that the phalanx was from the middle toe of a new species of ratite distinct from the contemporary Struthio asiaticus and Dromaius sivalensis (a purported species of emu from India also known from toe bones that themselves likely belong to an ungulate mammal).

Lydekker would later classify the fossil as "Genus, non det." in 1884, and in 1891 he referred the fossil to its own genus and species, Hypselornis sivalensis (despite using the same specific name, Lydekker named H. sivalensis as a new species independent of D. sivalensis). An etymology for the name was never given by Lydekker, but one was offered by ornithologist Charles Wallace Richmond as deriving from the Ancient Greek "ὑψηλός" (lofty, towering) and "ὄρνις" (bird).

== Classification ==
As indicated by the name, Hypselornis was originally interpreted as a fossil bird. It was first classified by Davies as belonging to a three-toe ratite similar to but distinct from emus and cassowaries, with a closer resemblance to the latter. Lydekker agreed with this classification when he named it as its own genus and included it within the family Casuariidae.

However, when the fossil was later examined by ornithologist Percy Lowe in 1929, he concluded that the bone was certainly not from a bird and instead most likely belonged to a crocodilian. He based this conclusion through comparisons of the bone to those of ratites and a crocodile, and found Hypselornis to resemble those of crocodiles in a number of ways. The bone is much more proportionately stout compared to those of ratites, and its asymmetry is also inconsistent with the toe bones of ratites. Furthermore, it does not taper towards its tip as it would in most ratites, and is instead constricted in its centre like that of a crocodile's. Rowe further identified six more details of the bone that were inconsistent with ratites, but similar to those of crocodiles. However, he was unable to perform a more conclusive diagnosis of Hypselornis without further comparison to other fossil Indian crocodilians. This re-identification has since been maintained by later authors.
