= Casuarius lydekkeri =

Casuarius lydekkeri Temporal range: Pliocene-Pleistocene

Scientific classification
- Kingdom: Animalia
- Phylum: Chordata
- Class: Aves
- Infraclass: Palaeognathae
- Order: Casuariiformes
- Family: Casuariidae
- Genus: Casuarius
- Species: C. lydekkeri

Binomial name
- Casuarius lydekkeri Rothschild, 1911

Extinct bird

The pygmy cassowary or small cassowary (Casuarius lydekkeri) is an extinct species of cassowary native to New South Wales and Papua New Guinea.

== Description ==
Remains attributed to the species are generally around the size of the living dwarf cassowary (Casuarius bennetti). Remains attributed to C. lydekkeri differ from living cassowaries in a number of morphological characters, including "a shallower, narrower pelvis, more gracile femur and a narrower proximal [closer to hip] end to the tarsometatarsus".

== Taxonomy ==
The species was originally described by Walter Rothschild based on a partial right tibiotarsus of probable Pleistocene age. The exact provenance is unknown, and was originally reported as coming from cave deposits near Wellington in New South Wales, though this is now considered unlikely. It has alternatively been proposed that it may originate from the Darling Downs in Queensland based on its preservation. Other remains attributed to C. lydekkeri have been reported from the Pliocene and Pleistocene of Australia and New Guinea, including a skeleton from bog deposits near Pureni the central highlands of Papua New Guinea, dating to the Late Pleistocene. The taxonomy of the species has been described as "problematic", and it has been said that there "is no indication of close affinity between these fossil forms [attributed to C. lydekkeri] and living cassowaries", and it has been suggested that all living cassowaries are more closely related to each other than to forms attributed to C. lydekkeri.
