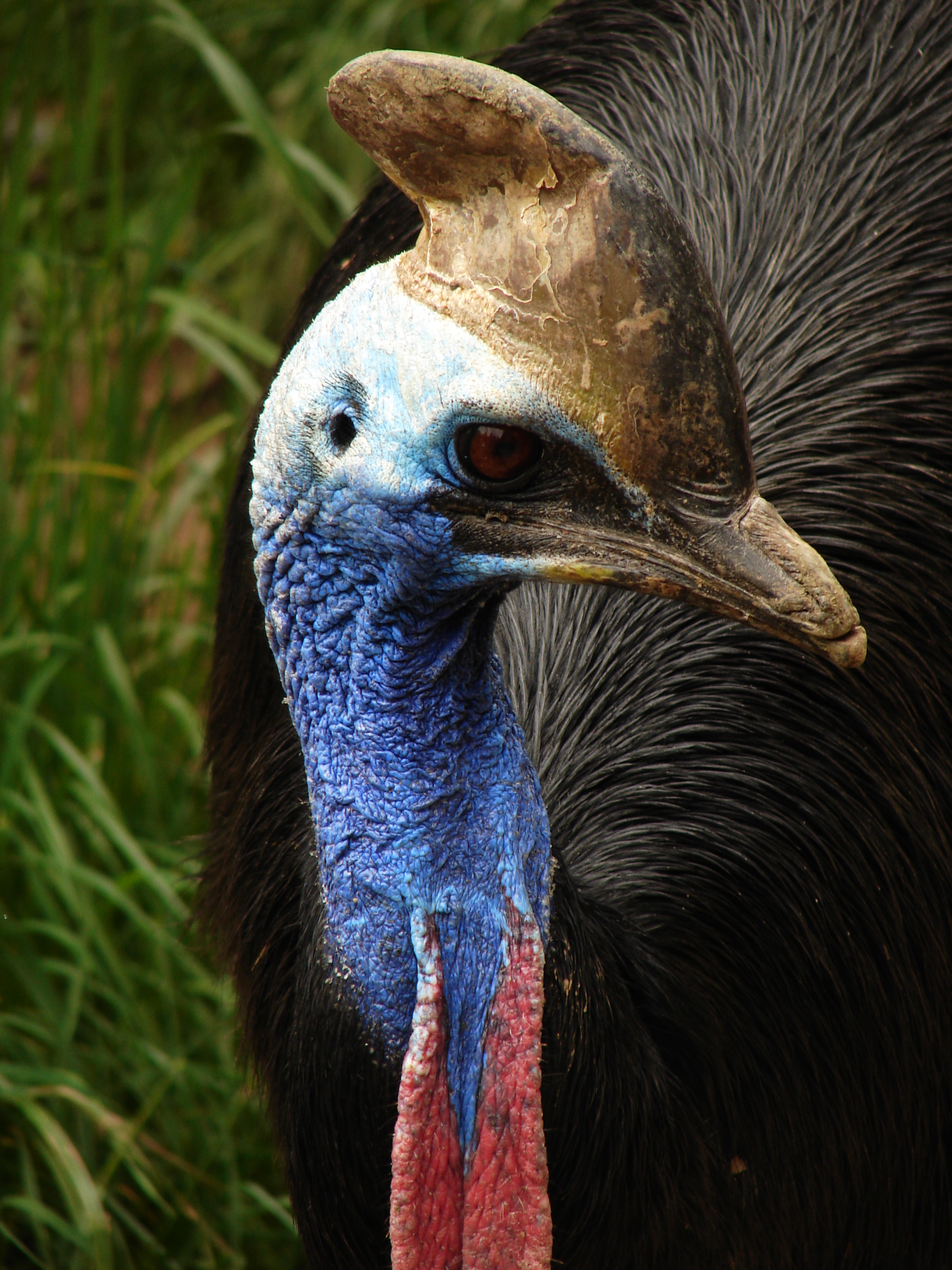
- Southern cassowary

Scientific classification
- Kingdom: Animalia
- Phylum: Chordata
- Class: Aves
- Infraclass: Palaeognathae
- Order: Casuariiformes
- Family: Casuariidae; Kaup, 1847

Genera
- Casuarius Brisson, 1760; Dromaius Vieillot, 1816; †Emuarius Boles, 1992

Diversity
- 2-3 genera, 6-7 species

= Casuariidae =

Family of birds

The bird family Casuariidae /kæsjuːəˈraɪ.ɪdiː/ has four surviving members: the three species of cassowary and the emu.

All living members of the family are very large flightless birds native to Australia-New Guinea.

== Species ==
- † Emuarius Boles, 1992 (emuwaries) (Late Oligocene – Late Miocene)
  - † E. gidju (Patterson & Rich 1987) Boles, 1992
  - † E. guljaruba Boles, 2001
- Casuarius Brisson, 1760 (cassowary)
  - † C. lydekkeri Rothschild, 1911 (Pygmy cassowary)
  - C. casuarius (Linnaeus, 1758) (Southern cassowary)
  - C. unappendiculatus Blyth, 1860 (Northern cassowary)
  - C. bennetti Gould, 1857 (Dwarf Cassowary)
    - C. b. westermanni (Sclater, 1874) (Papuan dwarf cassowary)
    - C. b. bennetti Gould, 1857 (Bennett's cassowary)
- Dromaius Vieillot, 1816 (emu)
  - †D. arleyekweke Yates & Worthy 2019
  - †D. ocypus Miller 1963
  - D. novaehollandiae (Latham, 1790) (Emu)
    - †D. n. diemenensis Le Souef, 1907 (Tasmanian emu)
    - †D. n. minor Spencer, 1906 (King Island emu)
    - †D. n. baudinianus Parker, SA, 1984 (Kangaroo Island emu)
    - D. n. novaehollandiae (Latham, 1790) (Emu)

== Systematics and evolution ==
Some Australian fossils initially believed to be from emus were recognized to represent a distinct genus, Emuarius, which had a cassowary-like skull and femur and an emu-like lower leg and foot.
