= Northern cassowary =

- At Weltvogelpark Walsrode

Conservation status
- Least Concern (IUCN 3.1)

Scientific classification
- Kingdom: Animalia
- Phylum: Chordata
- Class: Aves
- Infraclass: Palaeognathae
- Order: Casuariiformes
- Family: Casuariidae
- Genus: Casuarius
- Species: C. unappendiculatus

Binomial name
- Casuarius unappendiculatus Blyth, 1860
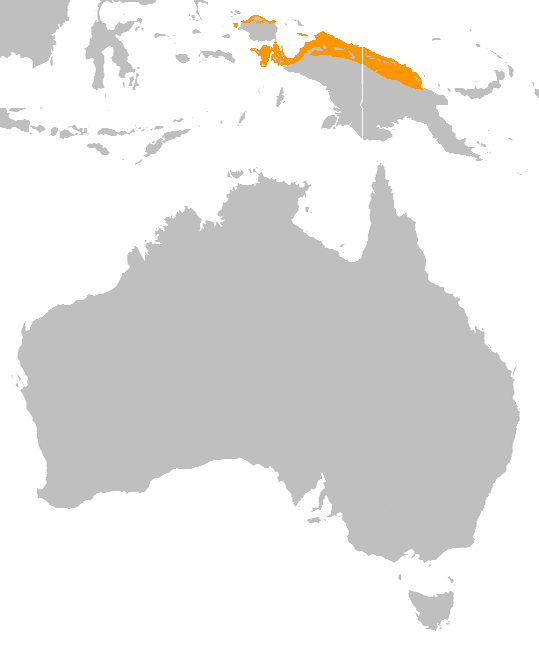
- Distribution of the northern cassowary

Synonyms
- List: Casuarius doggetti Rothschild 1904; Casuarius unappendiculatus doggetti (Rothschild 1904); Casuarius unappendiculatus hagenbecki (Rothschild 1904); Casuarius unappendiculatus jamrachi (Rothschild 1904); Casuarius unappendiculatus mitratus Rothschild 1904; Casuarius unappendiculatus multicolor Le Souef 1930; Casuarius unappendiculatus suffusus Rothschild 1904; Casuarius rothschildi Matschie 1901; Casuarius unappendiculatus rothschildi (Matschie 1901); Casuarius philipi Rothschild 1898; Casuarius unappendiculatus philipi (Rothschild 1898); Casuarius unappendiculatus unappendiculatus (Blyth 1860); Casuarius occipitalis Salvadori 1878; Casuarius unappendiculatus occipitalis (Salvadori 1878); Casuarius unappendiculatus rufotinctus Rothschild 1900; Casuarius unappendiculatus aurentiacus Rothschild 1899; Casuarius kaupi Rosenberg 1861; Casuarius laglaizei Oustalet 1893

Species of flightless bird

The northern cassowary (Casuarius unappendiculatus), also known as the one-wattled cassowary, single-wattled cassowary, or golden-necked cassowary, is a large, stocky flightless bird of northern New Guinea. It is one of the three living species of cassowary, alongside the dwarf cassowary and the southern cassowary. It is a ratite, a polyphyletic group of flightless Paleognaths, which includes birds like the ostrich and emu.

== Taxonomy ==
Edward Blyth first identified the northern cassowary from a specimen from an aviary located in Calcutta, India, in 1860. It is the most recently discovered of all the cassowary species. The genus name Casuarius is derived from the Malay word kesuari "cassowary", while the species name unappendiculatus refers to the species' single wattle. Officially, there are no subspecies, though some authors list several subspecies.

== Description ==
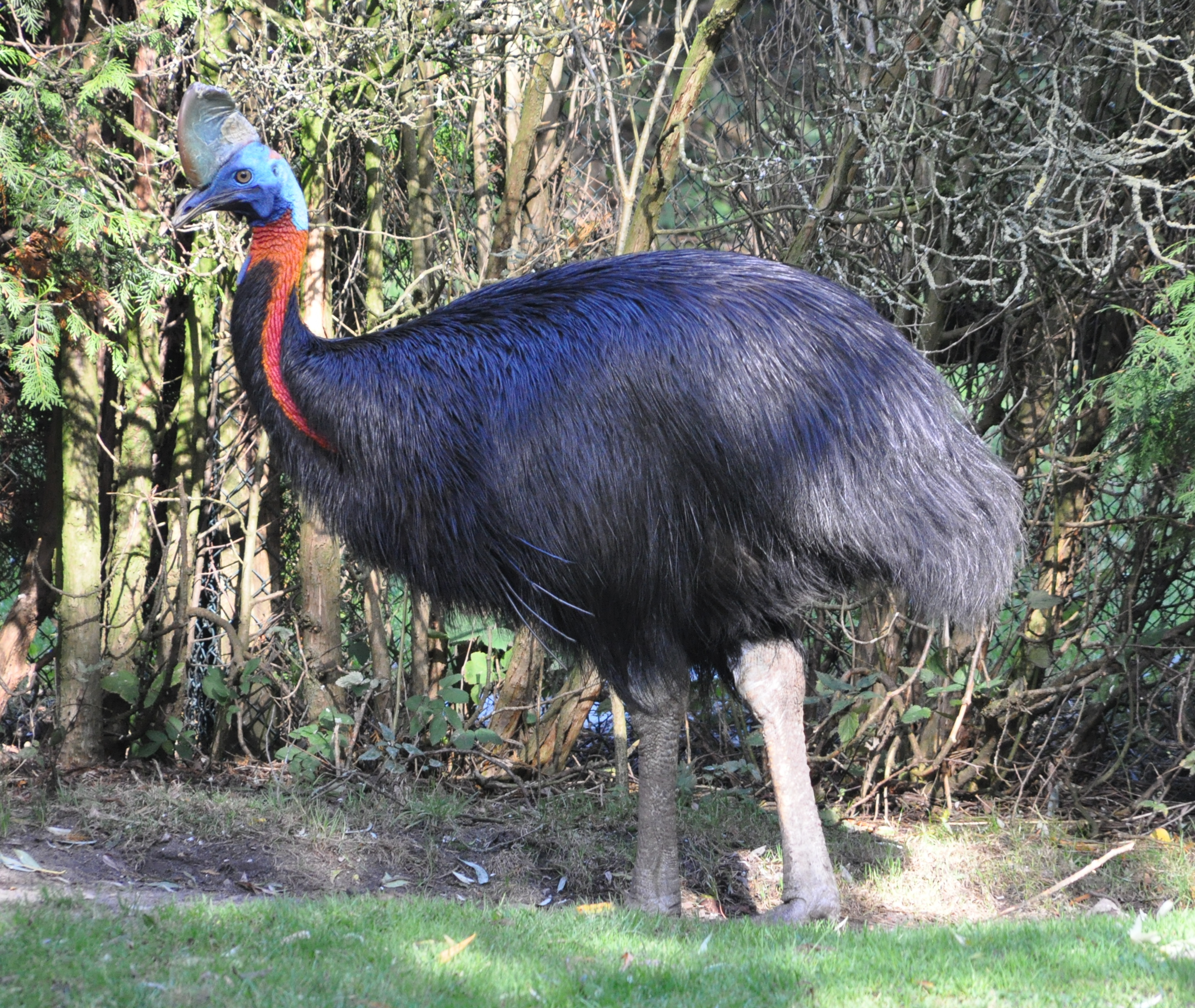
At Walsrode Bird Park

The northern cassowary has a hard and stiff black plumage, blue facial skin and a casque on top of the head. In 2026, scientists discovered that northern cassowary casques glow under UV light, and in different patterns than southern cassowary casques. It has a bright red or yellow coloured neck and wattle. The feet are huge and strong with a long, dagger-like claw on its inner toe.

A large bird, the adults weigh between 25–60 kg (55–132 lb). The sexes are similar in appearance, however the female is larger. The male weighs 36.6–38.5 kg (81–85 lb) while the female weighs around 58 kg (128 lb). These birds measure 149 cm (4 ft 10 1/2 in) long and stand 1.5–1.8 m (4 ft 11 in – 5 ft 11 in) in height. Compared to the southern cassowary, the northern cassowary has a slightly shorter bill, at 12 to 13.7 cm (4.7 to 5.4 in), but a slightly longer tarsal length, at 28 to 33.2 cm (11.0 to 13.1 in).

== Phylogeny ==
Northern cassowaries are members of the family Casuariidae, of which there are only four extant members: Three of them being the Cassowaries; the other the last remaining extant species of emu. All present superficial similarities, along being large flightless birds. The northern cassowary and the emu share homologous features. For example, both have a blue patch of colour on their face/neck, but the functions of these differ. The emu's patch is of a paler colour and is used as a form of camouflage where it is located. The northern cassowary's patch of blue is brighter, and is used for attracting mates.

An alternate classification was proposed in 2014 by Mitchell et al., based on analysis of mitochondrial DNA. This splits off the Casuariidae into their own order, the Casuariiformes, and includes only the cassowaries in the family Casuariidae, placing the emus in their own family, Dromaiidae.

== Range and habitat ==
The northern cassowary is endemic to the coastal swamps and lowland rainforests of the islands of New Guinea (north of the Central Cordillera and some areas west of the Cendrawasih Bay, as far as Raja Ampat Regency), Yapen, Batanta and Salawati, in the countries of Indonesia and the Papua New Guinea. They prefer to not inhabit elevations exceeding 490 m (1,610 ft) above sea level, but a 2026 study found northern cassowaries were present at much higher elevations than the previously thought maximum, up to 1,962 m (6,437 ft).

Breeding population and trends
Location	Population	Trend
Batanta	Unknown	Declining
Papua New Guinea	Unknown	Declining
Salawati	Unknown	Declining
Waigeo	Unknown	Declining
Yapen	Unknown	Declining
Total	2,500 to 10,000	Declining

== Behaviour ==
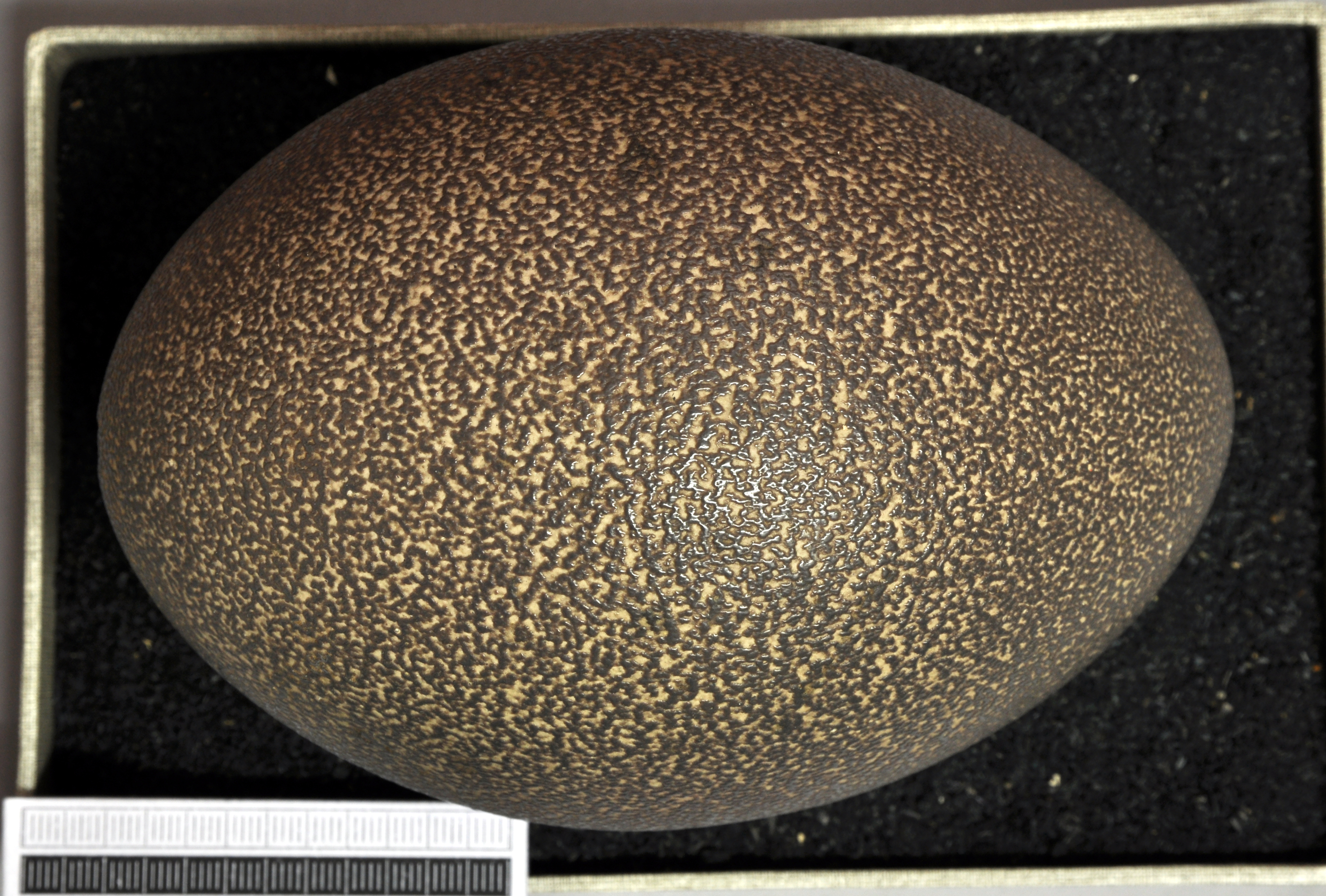
Egg, Collection Museum Wiesbaden

As with other cassowaries, the northern cassowary is a shy and solitary bird. Their diet consists mainly of berries, fruits and small animals, such as mice, rats, frogs, snakes, lizards, smaller birds and a variety of small insects and snails. They will eat dead animals when they find them. The young have been observed to eat the feces of the males raising them and clutch mates. Adults will eat their own feces as it often contains undigested fruits. They make grunting and hissing sounds, like other cassowaries.

In the breeding season, the polygamous female lays three to five green eggs on a well camouflaged nest prepared by the male; she then leaves the nest and eggs to find another mate. Eggs are 13.9–16 cm (5.5–6.3 in) in length and 9.3–10.5 cm (3.7–4.1 in) in width with an estimated mass of 622 grams. The male incubates the eggs for around 50 days and raises the chicks alone for about nine months.

== Conservation ==
Although subject to ongoing habitat loss and overhunting in some areas, as of 2017, the northern cassowary is evaluated as Least concern on the IUCN Red List of Threatened Species, as population size estimates suggest that populations are actually larger than previously estimated. However, it is the most threatened of the three extant cassowary types as of 2022. Hunting is still considered the biggest threat. Native people use the bones and eggs, and take the chicks to be raised for meat. As logging opens up more areas of the forest, hunting will be more of a problem. Their occurrence range is 186,000 km^{2} (72,000 sq mi) and a 2000 estimate placed their numbers at 9300.
