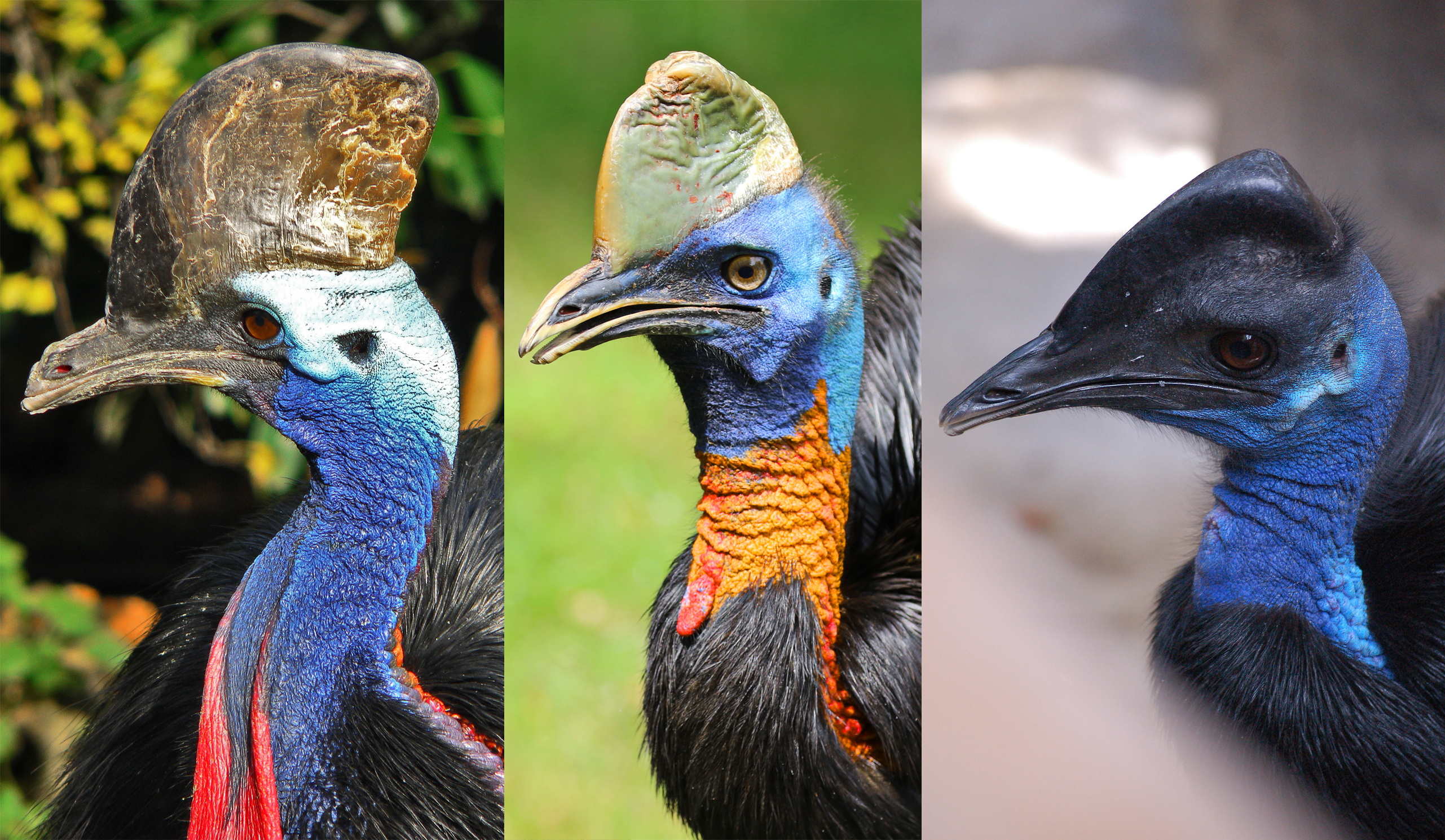
- Montage of three species; left to right: southern cassowary, northern cassowary, and dwarf cassowary

Scientific classification
- Kingdom: Animalia
- Phylum: Chordata
- Class: Aves
- Infraclass: Palaeognathae
- Order: Casuariiformes
- Family: Casuariidae
- Genus: Casuarius; Brisson, 1760

Type species
- Struthio casuarius Linnaeus, 1758

Species
- Casuarius casuarius Southern cassowary; Casuarius unappendiculatus Northern cassowary; Casuarius bennetti Dwarf cassowary; † Casuarius lydekkeri Pygmy cassowary

Synonyms
- Casoarius Bonhote; Cela Oken, 1816; Cela Moehr, 1752 nomen rejectum; Rhea Lacépède, 1800 non Latham 1790; Chelarga Billberg, 1828; Oxyporus Brookes, 1828; Thrasys Billberg, 1828; Cassowara Perry, 1811; Hippalectryo Gloger, 1842

= Cassowary =

Cassowary Temporal range: 5–0 Ma Early Pliocene – Recent

Genus of flightless birds

Cassowaries (Indonesian: kasuari; Biak: man suar 'bird strong'; Tok Pisin: muruk) are flightless birds of the genus Casuarius, in the order Casuariiformes. They are classified as ratites, flightless birds without a keel on their sternum bones. Cassowaries are native to the tropical forests of New Guinea (Western New Guinea and Papua New Guinea), the Moluccas (Seram and Aru Islands), and northeastern Australia.

Three cassowary species are extant. The most common, the southern cassowary, is the fourth-tallest and third-heaviest living bird, smaller only than the two species of ostrich and the emu. The other two species of cassowary are the northern cassowary and the dwarf cassowary; the northern cassowary is the most recently discovered and the most threatened. A fourth, extinct, species is the pygmy cassowary.

Cassowaries are very wary of humans, but if provoked, they are capable of inflicting serious, even fatal, injuries. They are known to attack both dogs and humans. The cassowary has often been labelled "the world's most dangerous bird", although in terms of recorded statistics, it pales in comparison to the common ostrich, which kills two to three humans per year in South Africa.

== Taxonomy, systematics, and evolution ==
The genus Casuarius was erected by French scientist Mathurin Jacques Brisson in his Ornithologie published in 1760. The type species is the southern cassowary (Casuarius casuarius). The Swedish naturalist Carl Linnaeus had introduced the genus Casuarius in the sixth edition of his Systema Naturae published in 1748, but Linnaeus dropped the genus in the important tenth edition of 1758 and put the southern cassowary together with the common ostrich and the greater rhea in the genus Struthio. As the publication date of Linnaeus's sixth edition was before the 1758 starting point of the International Commission on Zoological Nomenclature, Brisson, and not Linnaeus, is considered the authority for the genus.

Cassowaries (from Malay: kasuari cognate of several related languages spoken around the Moluccas and New Guinea) are part of the ratite group, which also includes the emu, rheas, ostriches, and kiwi, as well as the extinct moas and elephant birds. These species are recognised:

Genus Casuarius – Brisson, 1760 – Four species
Common name	Scientific name and subspecies	Range	Size and ecology	IUCN status and estimated population
Southern cassowary or double-wattled cassowary	Casuarius casuarius (Linnaeus, 1758)	southern New Guinea, northeastern Australia, and the Aru Islands, mainly in lowlands	Size: Habitat: Diet:	LC
Northern cassowary or single-wattled cassowary	Casuarius unappendiculatus Blyth, 1860	Northern and western New Guinea, and Yapen, mainly in lowlands	Size: Habitat: Diet:	LC
Dwarf cassowary or Bennett's cassowary	Casuarius bennetti Gould, 1857	New Guinea, New Britain, and Yapen, mainly in highlands	Size: Habitat: Diet:	LC
† Pygmy cassowary or small cassowary	Casuarius lydekkeri Rothschild, 1911	Pleistocene fossils of New South Wales and Papua New Guinea	Size: Habitat: Diet:	EX

Most authorities consider the taxonomic classification above to be monotypic, but several subspecies of each have been described, and some of them have even been suggested as separate species, e.g., C. (b) papuanus. The taxonomic name C. (b) papuanus also may be in need of revision to Casuarius (bennetti) westermanni. Validation of these subspecies has proven difficult due to individual variations, age-related variations, the scarcity of specimens, the stability of specimens (the bright skin of the head and neck—the basis of describing several subspecies—fades in specimens), and the practice of trading live cassowaries for thousands of years, some of which are likely to have escaped or been deliberately introduced to regions away from their origin.

The evolutionary history of cassowaries, as of all ratites, is not well known. Genetic evidence suggests that their closest living relatives are emus, and that the dwarf cassowary is more closely related to the Northern Cassowary than either is to the Southern cassowary. A fossil species was reported from Australia, but for reasons of biogeography, this assignment is not certain, and it might belong to the prehistoric Emuarius, which was a genus of cassowary-like primitive emus.

== Description ==
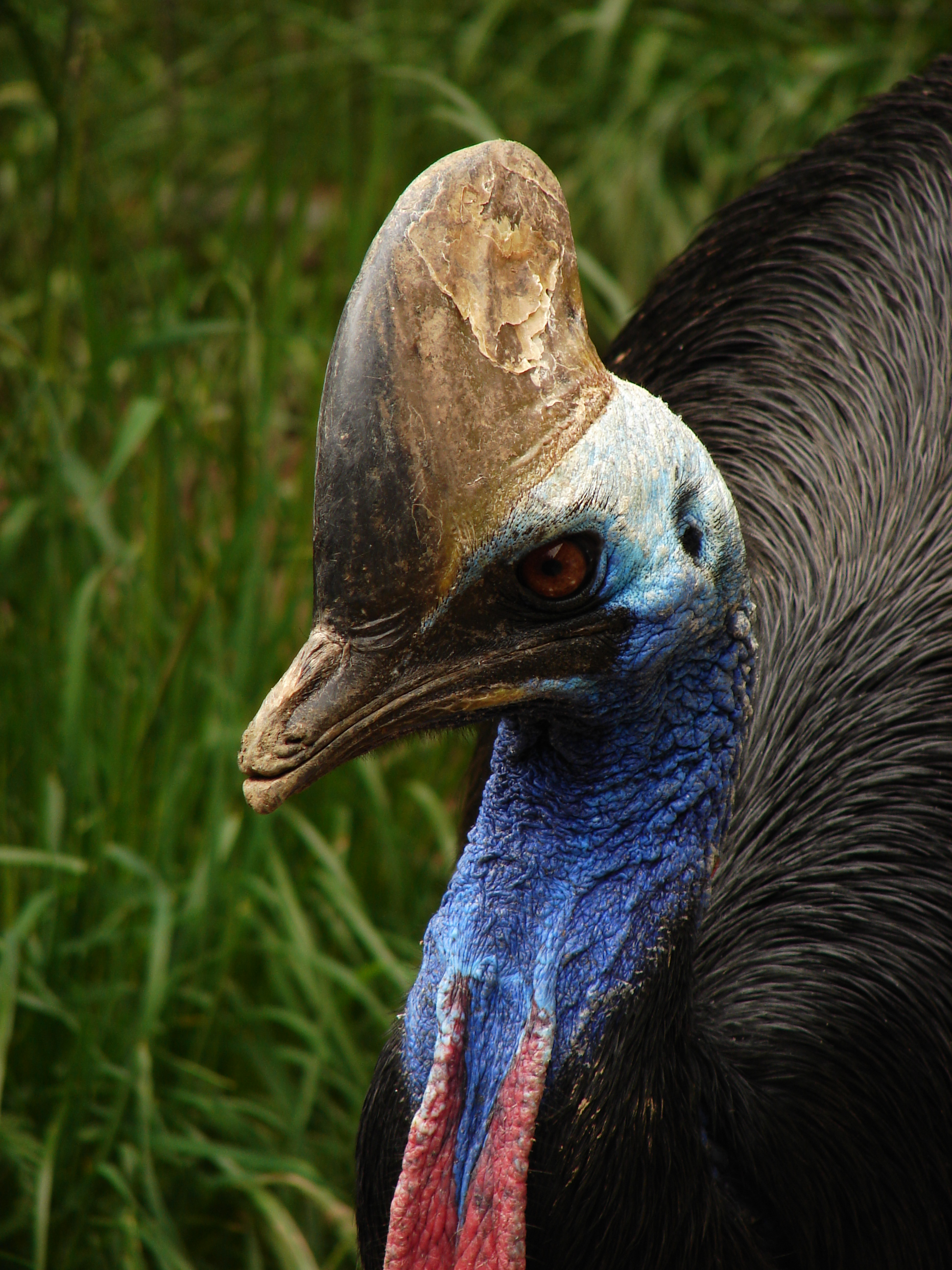
Close-up of the head of a southern cassowary

Typically, all cassowaries are shy birds that are found in the deep forest. They are adept at disappearing long before a human knows they are there. The southern cassowary of the far north Queensland rain forests is not well studied, and the northern and dwarf cassowaries even less so. Females are larger and more brightly coloured than the males. Adult southern cassowaries are 1.5 to 1.8 m (4 ft 11 in to 5 ft 11 in) tall, although some females may reach 2 m (6 ft 6 1/2 in). Cassowaries are heavy birds typically weighing between 15–76 kg (33–168 lb), Dwarf cassowaries are much smaller than northern or southern cassowaries.

Due to inhabiting the Aru islands, the southern cassowary is considered Asia's largest bird since the extinction of the Arabian ostrich. Moreover, not only is the cassowary Asia's largest bird, within New Guinea, the cassowary is the island's second largest terrestrial animal after the introduction of cervids such as the rusa deer, chital, and fallow deer.

All cassowaries' feathers consist of a shaft and loose barbules. They do not have rectrices (tail feathers) or a preen gland. Cassowaries have small wings with five or six large remiges. These are reduced to stiff, keratinous quills, resembling porcupine quills, with no barbs. The furcula and coracoid are degenerate, and their palatal bones and sphenoid bones touch each other. These, along with their wedge-shaped body, are thought to be adaptations to ward off vines, thorns, and saw-edged leaves, allowing them to run quickly through the rainforest.

Cassowaries have been falsely thought to lack a tongue, however they indeed have tongues. Their beaks are pointed, sharp and robust but not serrated, which allows them to pick up fruit more easily than the short bills of an emu or an ostrich.

Cassowaries have three-toed feet with sharp claws. The inner (first) toe has a dagger-like claw that may be 125 mm (5 in) long. This claw is particularly fearsome, since cassowaries sometimes kick humans and other animals with their powerful legs. Cassowaries can run at up to 50 km/h (30 mph) through the dense forest and can jump up to 1.5 m (4 ft 11 in). They are good swimmers, crossing wide rivers and swimming in the sea.

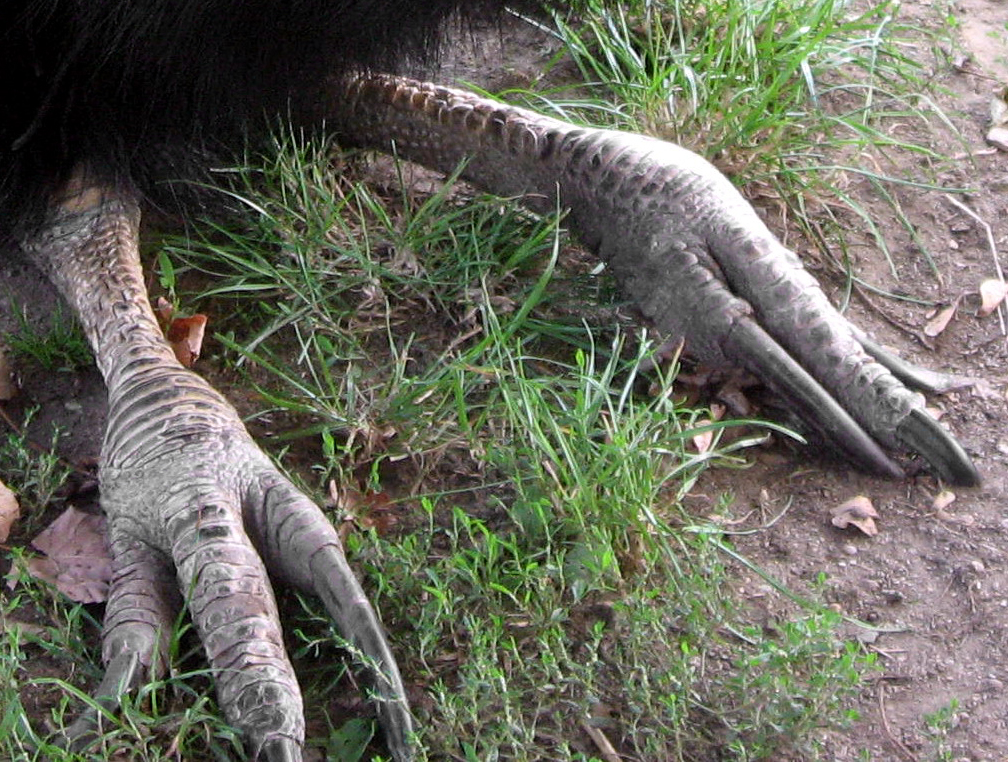
Feet of a southern cassowary: Cassowaries use their feet as weapons.

All three species have a keratinous, skin-covered casque on their heads that grows with age. The casque's shape and size, up to 18 cm (7 in), is species-dependent. C. casuarius has the largest and C. bennetti the smallest (tricorn shape), with C. unappendiculatus having variations in between. Contrary to earlier findings, the hollow inside of the casque is spanned with fine fibres. In 2026, scientists discovered that casques on both living and deceased cassowaries glow in ultraviolet light. Scientists further discovered that "different species glowed in similar colors, but in distinct patterns across their casques. The dwarf cassowary, which has a jet black casque, did not fluoresce at all, whereas the southern and northern cassowary, which have casques with dull greens, yellows, and browns, glowed in different places."

Several functions for the casque have been proposed. One is that they are a secondary sexual characteristic. Other suggested functions include batting through the underbrush, as a weapon in dominance disputes, or pushing aside leaf litter during foraging. The latter three are disputed by biologist Andrew Mack, whose personal observation suggests that the casque amplifies deep sounds. This is related to a discovery that at least the dwarf cassowary and southern cassowary produce very low-frequency sounds, which may aid in communication in dense rainforests. The "boom" vocalization that cassowaries produce is the lowest-frequency bird call known and is at the lower limit of human hearing. Recent study suggests that casque acts as a thermal radiator, offloading heat at high temperatures and restricting heat loss at low temperatures. After the 2026 discovery that cassowary casques glow under ultraviolet light, scientists analyzed the ultraviolet wavelengths reflecting from the casques and found that the reflected wavelengths were between 365-385 nanometers, meaning cassowaries might be able to see them. This discovery gives further weight to the hypothesis that cassowary casques play some role in visual display and signaling.

The average lifespan of wild cassowaries is approximately 18–20 years, with those held in captivity living up to 40 years.

== Behaviour and ecology ==
Cassowaries are solitary birds except during courtship, egg-laying, and sometimes around ample food supplies. Males and females each maintain separate territories that overlap, of a size of approximately 3 square kilometres in one study. While females move among satellite territories of different males, they appear to remain within the same territories for most of their lives, mating with the same, or closely related, males over the course of their lives.

Courtship and pair-bonding rituals begin with the vibratory sounds broadcast by females. Males approach and run with their necks parallel to the ground while making dramatic movements of their heads, which accentuate the frontal neck region. The female approaches drumming slowly. The male crouches on the ground, and the female either steps on the male's back for a moment before crouching beside him in preparation for copulation, or she may attack. This is often the case with the females pursuing the males in ritualistic chasing behaviours that generally terminate in water. The male cassowary dives into water and submerges himself up to his upper neck and head. The female pursues him into the water, where he eventually drives her to the shallows, where she crouches making ritualistic motions of her head. The two may remain in copulation for extended periods of time. In some cases, another male may approach and run off the first male. He will climb onto her to copulate, as well.

Both male and female cassowaries do not tolerate the presence of others of the same sex, but females are more prone to fight than males, which will generally flee when encountering another male. While males and females may also be territorial and confrontational, this decreases during the mating season

=== Reproduction ===
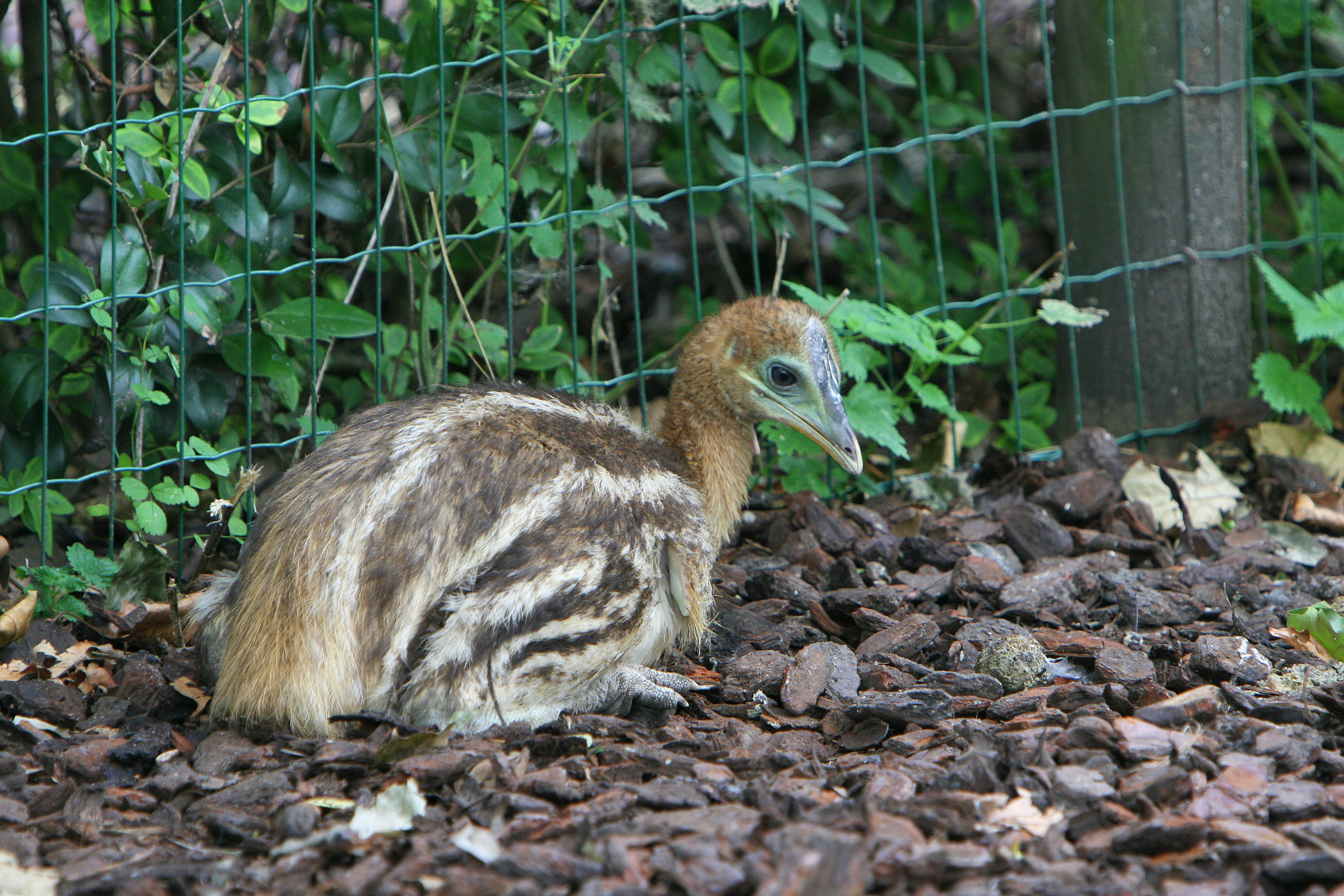
Juvenile southern cassowary

The cassowary breeding season starts in May to June. Females lay three to eight large, bright green or pale green-blue eggs in each clutch into a heap of leaf litter prepared by the male. The eggs measure about 9 by 14 cm (3.5 by 5.5 in) – only ostrich and emu eggs are larger.

The male incubates those eggs for 50–52 days, removing or adding litter to regulate the temperature, then protects the chicks, which stay in the nest for about 9 months. He defends them fiercely against all potential predators, including humans. The young males later go off to find a territory of their own.

The female does not care for the eggs or the chicks, but rather moves on within her territory to lay eggs in the nests of several other males. Young cassowaries are brown and have buffy stripes. They are often kept as pets in native villages (in New Guinea), where they are permitted to roam like barnyard fowl until nearing maturity. Caged birds are regularly bereft of their fresh plumes.

=== Diet ===
Fruit from at least 26 plant families has been documented in the diet of cassowaries. Fruits from the laurel, podocarp, palm, wild grape, nightshade, and myrtle families are important items in the diet. The poisonous cassowary plum takes its name from the bird. The bird avoids the poisons of these fruits due to the presence of their incredibly short gastrointestinal tract, the shortest of all ratites in relation to their size. The cassowary's incredibly short and simple digestive tract leads to a short gut retention time which allow seeds to remain unharmed during the comparatively soft digestion process and allows them to consume fruits that contain toxins such as cyanogens.

Where trees are dropping fruit, cassowaries come in and feed, with each bird defending a tree from others for a few days. They move on when the fruit is depleted. Fruit, even items as large as bananas and apples, is swallowed whole. Cassowaries are a keystone species of rain forests because they eat fallen fruit whole and distribute seeds across the jungle floor via excrement.

Adult and young cassowaries also practice coprophagia. As adult waste often contain half-digested fruit which still has nutritional value, birds will devour each other's as well as their own droppings.

In more urbanised areas, especially in Queensland, Australia, 'urbanised' cassowaries have adapted to also feed from picnic blankets, tables and baskets or backyard bird feeders and compost heaps, thereby consuming a wide range of non-natural and non-native foods as well. Cassowaries are also known to eat non-edible items — in one case, reports of the contents of urban cassowary droppings included, apart from the skeletal remains of a honeyeater, remains of a child's coloured building blocks, marbles and a small plastic car from a cereal packet. In terms of roadkill, discarded fish was reported; another type of roadkill reported eaten by cassowaries is the bandicoot.

In captivity, cassowaries get the majority of their protein source from dog or monkey food. Captive cassowaries consume almost 1 L (0.22 imp gal; 0.26 US gal) of a protein source (such as dog food) in conjunction with almost 19 L (4.2 imp gal; 5.0 US gal) of fruit a day.

=== Role in seed dispersal and germination ===
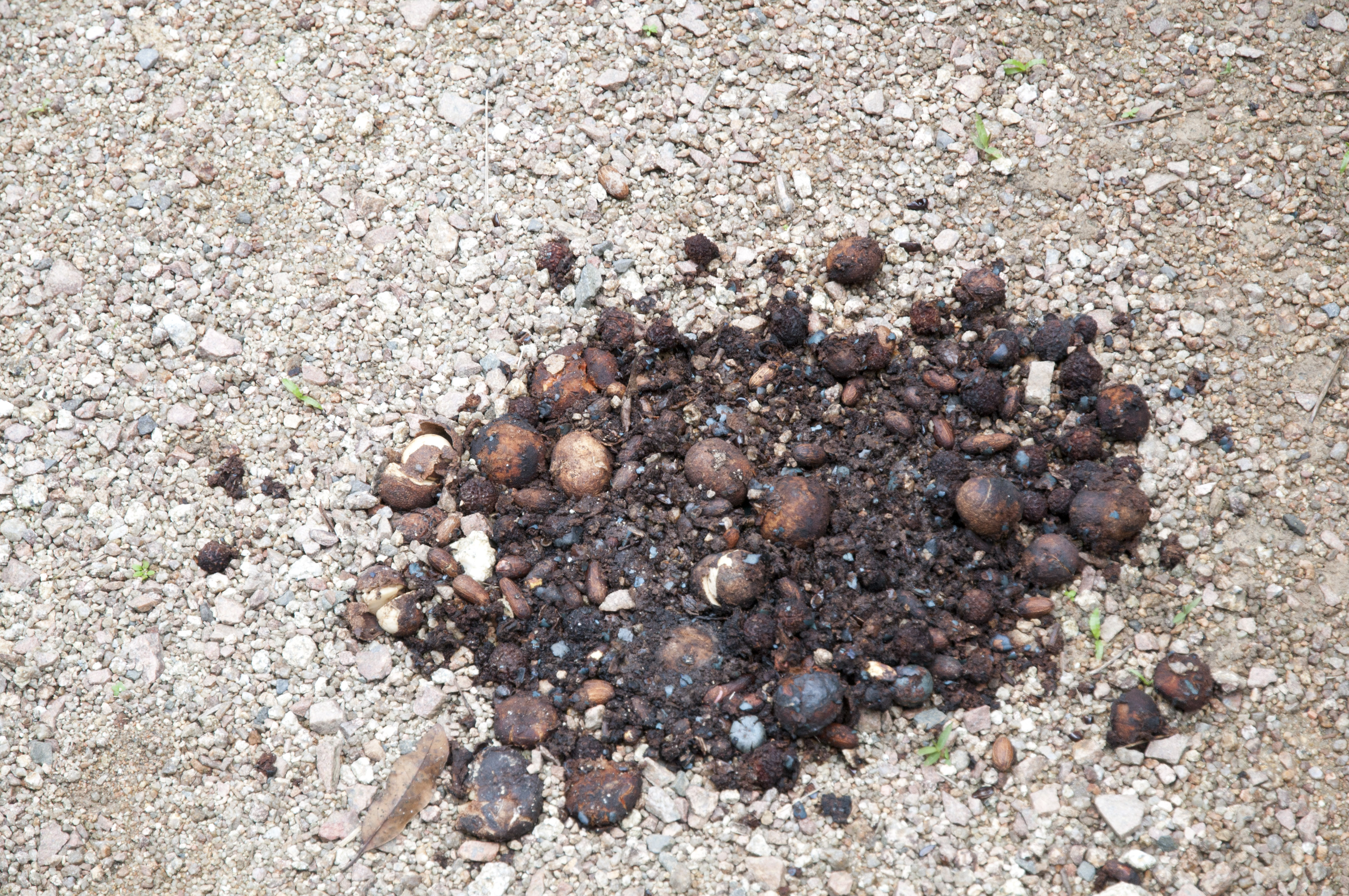
Cassowary feces, containing traces of seeds

Cassowaries feed on the fruit of several hundred rainforest species and usually pass viable seeds in large, dense scats. They are known to disperse seeds over distances greater than a kilometre, thus playing an important role in the ecosystem. Germination rates for seeds of the rare Australian rainforest tree Ryparosa were found to be much higher after passing through a cassowary's gut (92% versus 4%).

=== Threats ===
In its main home of New Guinea, cassowaries are the island's largest and most dominant and formidable bird, as well as being one of the largest terrestrial endemic animals in New Guinea. As such, adult cassowaries have no natural enemies other than humans (and even then, the birds are rarely hunted due to their reputation, speed, wariness and self-defence, with juveniles being preferred over adults for ceremonial purposes - on average, it is considered very fortunate for a human hunter to kill one in every five years). With regards to their relationship with the New Guinea singing dogs—one of New Guinea's two obligate terrestrial apex predators, the other being the crocodile monitor—adult birds generally ignore them, with some even believing that the dogs take full advantage of the birds' foraging behaviour, as both species share and use the same feeding trail through the forests. It was believed that these dogs follow adult birds to catch small prey attracted to the dropped fruits on the rainforest floor. Nevertheless, there was a report from a native hunter of an exceptionally rare case of a singing dog attacking the dwarf species. The incident ended with the singing dog being disemboweled and ripped open by the bird. In general, however, both animals mutually keep their distance and avoid one another.

Cassowary chicks are vulnerable to pythons (large pythons prey on southern cassowary chicks in northern Australia, and pythons prey on cassowary chicks in New Guinea), monitor lizards (monitor lizards prey on southern cassowary chicks in northern Australia, and crocodile monitors prey on cassowary chicks in New Guinea), New Guinea singing dogs, and Papuan eagles. When threatened, it is known that cassowary chicks emit different vocalisation calls to indicate the specific threat, such as a hawk, before running underneath their father. Adult males aggressively defend their chicks. While adult males usually scare off or kill most predators, a chick will occasionally be separated in the chaos and become a potential target.

However, in the relic populations of north-eastern Australia, the cassowary population faces threats from vehicles, and are in danger of being outcompeted by wild boars, with their eggs being most vulnerable to boar predation. Their chicks also face dangers and predation from domesticated dogs, which has resulted in a widespread decline in the Australian mainland. Because of such frequent inter-species conflicts, hunting dogs are one of the biggest enemies for cassowaries, and it is not unheard of for hunting dogs to accidentally kill cassowary chicks instead of feral pigs, with the dogs in turn being killed by the nearby adult rooster. Outside of threats from invasive species, the birds are also vulnerable to being unintentionally poisoned as well. It is unknown why the cassowary population in Australia is in decline, as the New Guinea population has dealt with introduced wild boars, dogs and feral cats for thousands of years longer with little to no impact on its population, suggesting that either the cassowaries of New Guinea had long adapted to human-introduced species or that the rich biodiversity of New Guinea allowed for additional niche partitioning.

Cassowary meat has been reported to be quite tough. Australian administrative officers stationed in New Guinea were advised that it "should be cooked with a stone in the pot: when the stone is ready to eat, so is the cassowary".

== Distribution and habitat ==
Cassowaries are native to the humid rainforests of New Guinea, nearby smaller islands, East Nusa Tenggara, the Maluku Islands, and northeastern Australia. They do, however, venture out into palm scrub, grassland, savanna, and swamp forest. The wild population of cassowaries is threatened by deforestation, hunting, and habitat destruction. Human presence and agricultural activities have also contributed to the decline of their population in some areas. To protect this species, various conservation efforts have been carried out, including preserving natural habitat and enforcing regulations against illegal hunting. In Indonesia, cassowaries are predominantly found in the rainforests of Papua, particularly in lowland and montane areas. In addition, cassowaries are known to inhabit protected areas such as Wasur National Park in Merauke and Lorentz National Park, which is the largest national park in Southeast Asia, encompassing a vast range of ecosystems from coastal to alpine environments. These birds play a critical ecological role in seed dispersal, contributing to the regeneration of forests in these protected areas. They can also be easily spotted in some national parks such as Mellwraith Range National Park, Paluma Range National Park, and Jardine National Park in Australia.

== Status and conservation ==
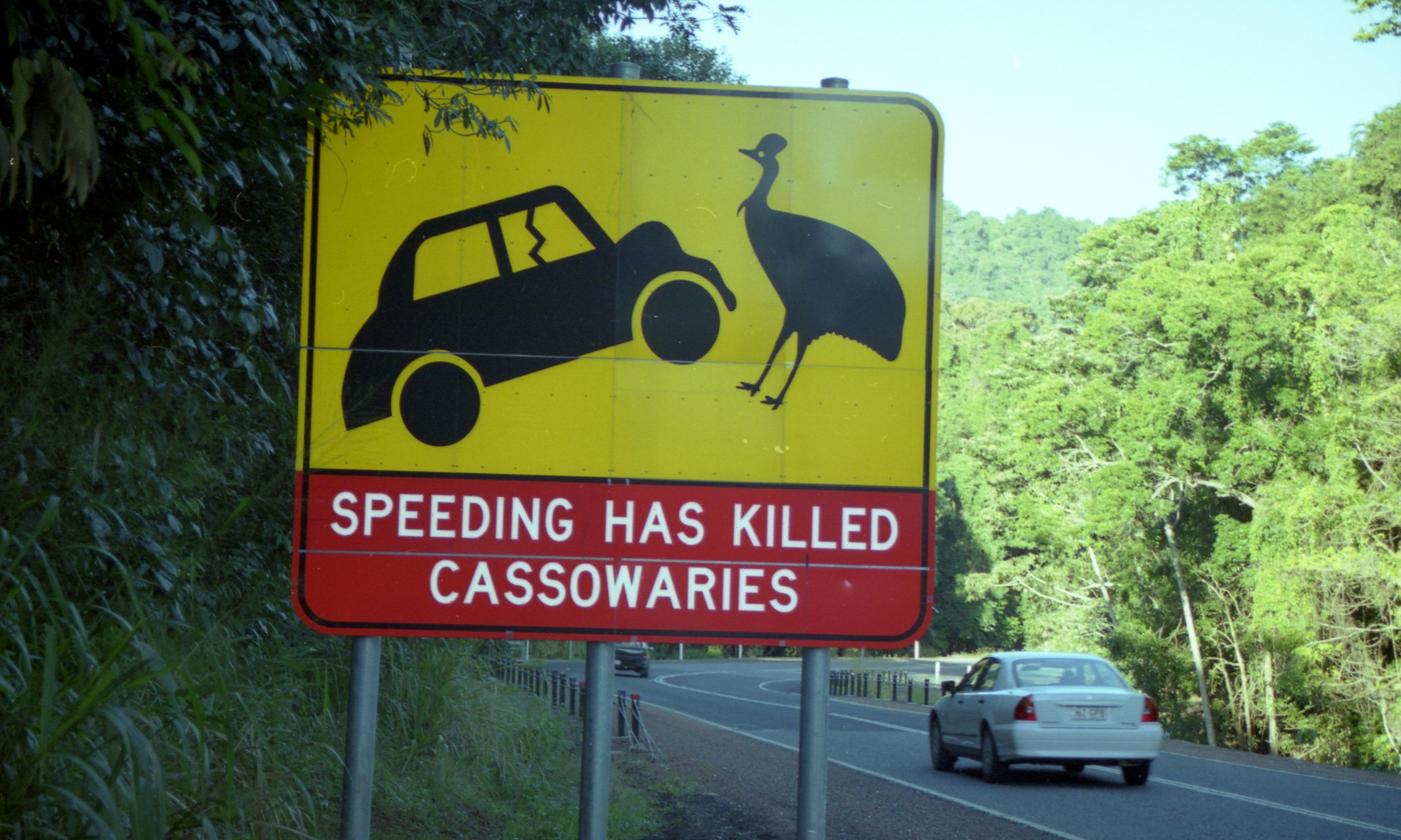
A road sign in Cairns, Queensland, Australia

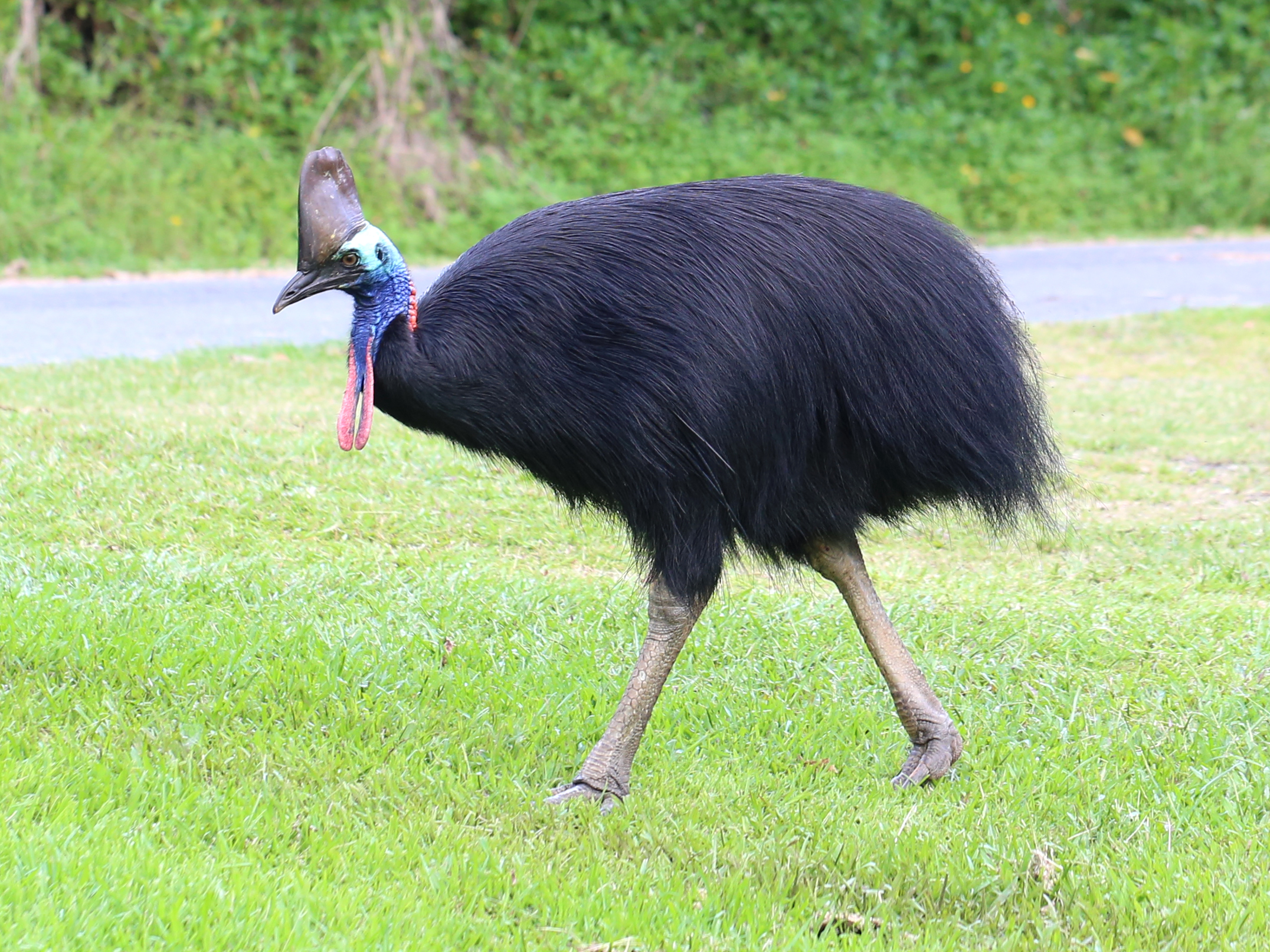
A free-ranging cassowary wandering in a tourist park at Etty Bay, Queensland

The southern cassowary is endangered in Queensland. Kofron and Chapman, upon assessing the decline of this species, found that only 20-25% of the former cassowary habitat remains. Habitat loss and fragmentation is the primary cause of decline. They then studied 140 cases of cassowary mortality, and found that motor-vehicle strikes accounted for 55% of the deaths, and dog attacks produced another 18%. Remaining causes of death included hunting (five cases), entanglement in wire (one case), the removal of cassowaries that attacked humans (four cases), and natural causes (18 cases), including tuberculosis (four cases). The cause for 14 cases was indicated as "for unknown reasons".

Hand feeding cassowaries poses a significant threat to their survival because it lures them into suburban areas. There, the birds are more susceptible to encounters with vehicles and dogs. Contact with humans encourages cassowaries to take food from picnic tables. Feral pigs also are a significant threat to their survival. They destroy nests and eggs of cassowaries, but their worst effect is as competitors for food, which may be catastrophic for cassowaries during lean times.

In February 2011, Cyclone Yasi destroyed a large area of cassowary habitat, endangering 200 of the birds – about 10% of the total Australian population.

The Mission Beach community in far north Queensland holds an annual Cassowary Festival in September, where funds are raised to map the bird's habitat.

Concerns have been raised about cassowaries as a potential invasive species on the island of Tasmania. According to the Department of Primary Industries, Parks, Water and Environment from Hobart, risk assessments on the cassowary as a potential invasive pest states that, while the birds may have trouble establishing a stable population on the island, they might be a destructive element to Tasmania's ecological diversity; the assessment recommends strict import controls. Cassowaries would be the island's largest and most dominant native terrestrial animal and could displace smaller animals in the same ecological niche. Frugivores such as the common brushtail possum, common ringtail possum, eastern pygmy possum and the little pygmy possum could be denied access to fruit, which they depend upon.

However, since Tasmania lacks the same levels of fruit diversity as Queensland and New Guinea, assessments state that the birds might adapt by also eating invertebrates and small vertebrates. This could lead to competition with the island's endemic insectivores, such as the eastern quoll, southern brown bandicoot, and eastern barred bandicoot.

== In captivity ==
The cassowary has solitary habits and breeds less frequently in zoos than other ratites such as the ostrich and emu. Unlike other ratites, it lives exclusively in tropical rainforests, making reproducing their habitat essential. Unlike the emu, which will live with other sympatric species, such as kangaroos, in "mixed Australian fauna" displays, the cassowary does not cohabit well among its own kind. Individual specimens must even be kept in separate enclosures, due to their solitary and aggressive nature.

The double-wattled cassowary (C. casuarius) is the most popular species in captivity, and it is fairly common in European and American zoos, where it is known for its distinctive appearance. As of 2019, only Weltvogelpark Walsrode in Germany has all three species of cassowaries in its collection: single-wattled cassowary (Casuarius unappendiculatus) and Bennett's cassowary (Casuarius bennetti). If subspecies are recognised, Weltvogelpark Walsrode has C. b. westermanni and C. u. rufotinctus.

== Relationship with humans ==
=== Role in Papuan cultures and semi-domestication ===
The cassowary is featured on the coat of arms of the Indonesian province of West Papua

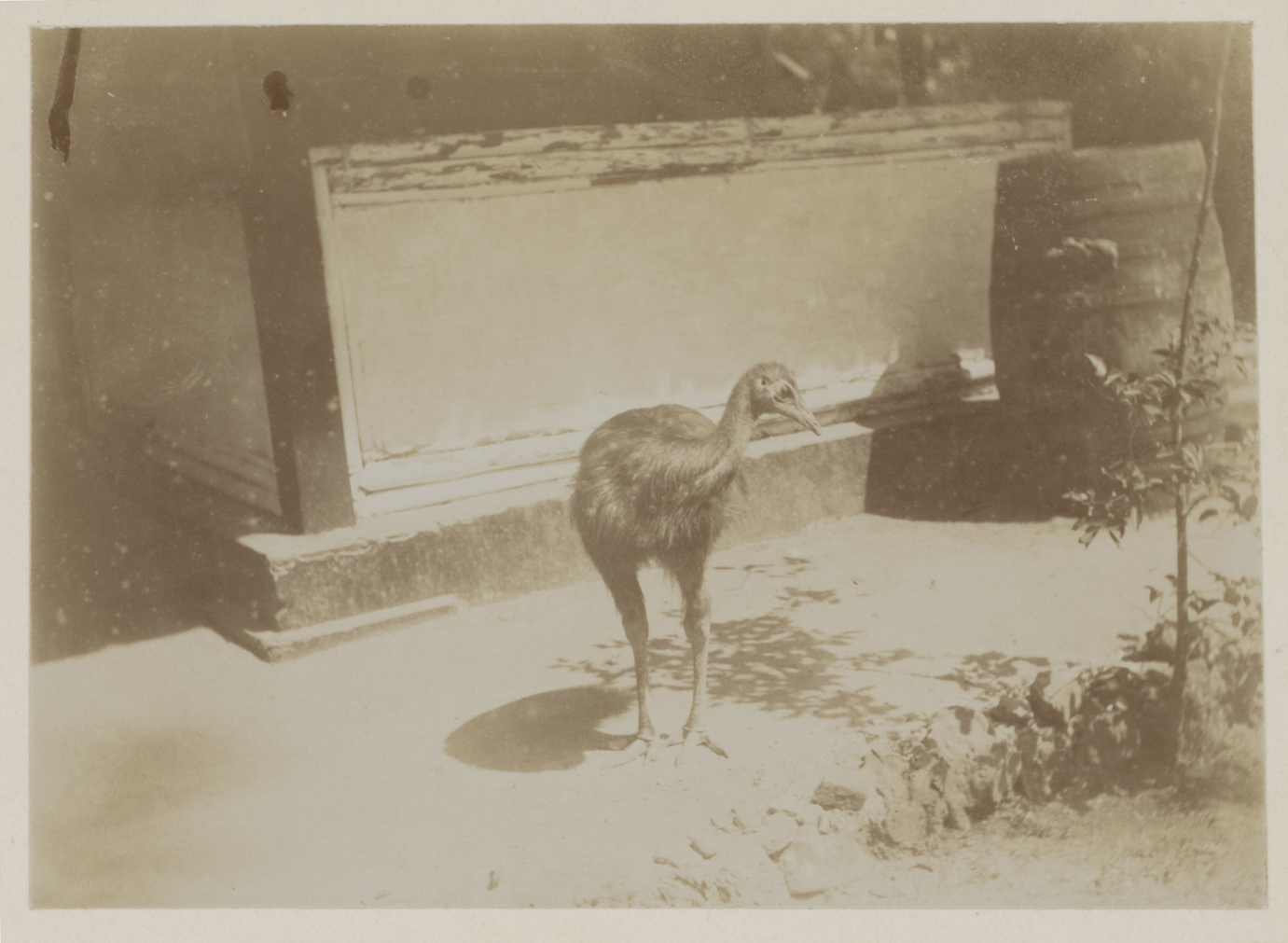
Cassowary held as a pet during the Siboga Expedition on Indonesia and New Guinea, 1899–1900

There is evidence that the cassowary may have been domesticated by humans thousands of years before the chicken. Some New Guinea Highlands societies capture cassowary chicks and raise them as semi-tame poultry, for use in ceremonial gift exchanges and as food. They are the only indigenous Australasian animal known to have been partly domesticated by people prior to European arrival and colonization and by definition, the oldest form of domesticated animal and the largest domesticated bird. The Maring people of Kundagai sacrificed cassowaries (C. bennetti) in certain rituals. The Kalam people considered themselves related to cassowaries, and did not classify them as birds, but as kin. Consequently, they use the Pandanus register of the Kalam language when eating cassowary meat.

Studies on Pleistocene/early Holocene cassowary remains in Papua suggest that indigenous people at the time preferred to harvest eggs rather than adults. They seem to have regulated their consumption of these birds, possibly even collecting eggs and rearing young birds as one of the earliest forms of domestication.

=== Urbanisation of local cassowary population ===
In extremely urbanised areas where cassowaries used to naturally live such as in Queensland, Australia or in Port Moresby, Papua New Guinea, the local cassowary population had adapted to its less forested grounds. Increasing urbanisation has increased the likelihood of human–cassowary interaction, a potentially dangerous mix.

It was found that cassowaries in these urban environments changed their diets accordingly, with urbanised cassowaries actually consuming an even greater proportion of fruits from exotic plants (~30%) but still incorporating a significant proportion of fruits from native plants in their diet. Likewise, as aforementioned, the high concentration of human activity in the urban ecology also equates to a higher concentration of food diversity and food waste, with these 'urbanised' cassowaries foraging for food scraps, bird feeders and outdoor picnic/food venues without fear from humans or domesticated animals due to the birds' size and reputation.

The high concentration of human activity as well as vehicles, mixed with domesticated animals and less forest coverage, had also changed their behaviours. These 'city' cassowaries were shown to exist in a higher state of activity and rested less than individuals inhabiting more intact swathes of rainforest, actively moving between urban gardens and the rainforest. The study give evidence that these birds showed a surprising amount of flexible foraging strategy that has enabled them to persist in rainforest-fragmented landscapes.

=== Attacks ===
Cassowaries have a reputation for being dangerous to people and domestic animals. During World War II, American and Australian troops stationed in New Guinea were warned to steer clear of them. In his 1958 book Living Birds of the World, ornithologist Ernest Thomas Gilliard wrote:

The inner or second of the three toes is fitted with a long, straight, murderous nail which can sever an arm or eviscerate an abdomen with ease. There are many records of natives being killed by this bird.

This assessment of the danger posed by cassowaries has been repeated in print by authors, including Gregory S. Paul and Jared Diamond. A 2003 historical study of 221 cassowary attacks showed that 150 had been against humans; 75% of these had been from cassowaries that had been fed by people, 71% of the time the bird had chased or charged the victim, and 15% of the time they kicked. Of the attacks, 73% involved the birds expecting or snatching food, 5% involved defending their natural food sources, 15% involved defending themselves, and 7% involved defending their chicks or eggs. Only one human death was reported among those 150 attacks.

The first documented human death caused by a cassowary was on April 6, 1926. In Australia, 16-year-old Phillip McClean and his brother, age 13, came across a cassowary on their property near Mossman, Queensland, and decided to try to kill it by striking it with clubs. The bird kicked the younger boy, who fell and ran away as his older brother struck the bird. The older McClean then tripped and fell to the ground. While he was on the ground, the cassowary kicked him in the neck, opening a 1.25-centimetre (0.49 in) wound that severed his jugular vein. The boy died of his injuries shortly thereafter.

Cassowary strikes to the abdomen are among the rarest of all, but in one case in 1995, a dog was kicked in the belly. The blow left no puncture, but severe bruising occurred. The dog later died from an apparent intestinal rupture.

Another human death due to a cassowary was recorded in Florida on April 12, 2019. The bird's owner, a 75-year-old man who had raised the animal, was apparently clawed to death after he fell to the ground.

In a 2017 Australian Birdlife article, Karl Brandt suggested Aboriginal encounters with the southern cassowary may have inspired the myth of the bunyip.

== Further wording ==
- Rothschild, Walter (1899). A Monograph of the Genus Casuarius. Transactions of the Zoological Society of London, vol. 15, pt. 5, December 1900.
