= Emuarius =

Emuarius Temporal range: Late Oligocene–Early Miocene

Scientific classification
- Kingdom: Animalia
- Phylum: Chordata
- Class: Aves
- Infraclass: Palaeognathae
- Order: Casuariiformes
- Family: Casuariidae
- Genus: †Emuarius; Boles, 1992

Species
- Emuarius guljaruba (Boles, 2001); Emuarius gidju (Patterson & Rich, 1987)

Extinct genus of birds

Emuarius is an extinct genus of casuariiform flightless bird from Australia that lived during the early Miocene and late Oligocene. It is one of two known genera of emu. There are two known species in the genus, Emuarius gidju and Emuarius guljaruba. The birds in this genus are known as emuwaries. This name comes from a combination of emu and cassowary. This is due to its cassowary-like skull and femur and emu-like lower leg and foot. Because of these similarities it is phylogenetically placed between cassowaries and emus. E. gidju has an estimated mass of 19-21 kg, less than the modern emu, and E. guljaruba is stated to be larger than E. gidju.
