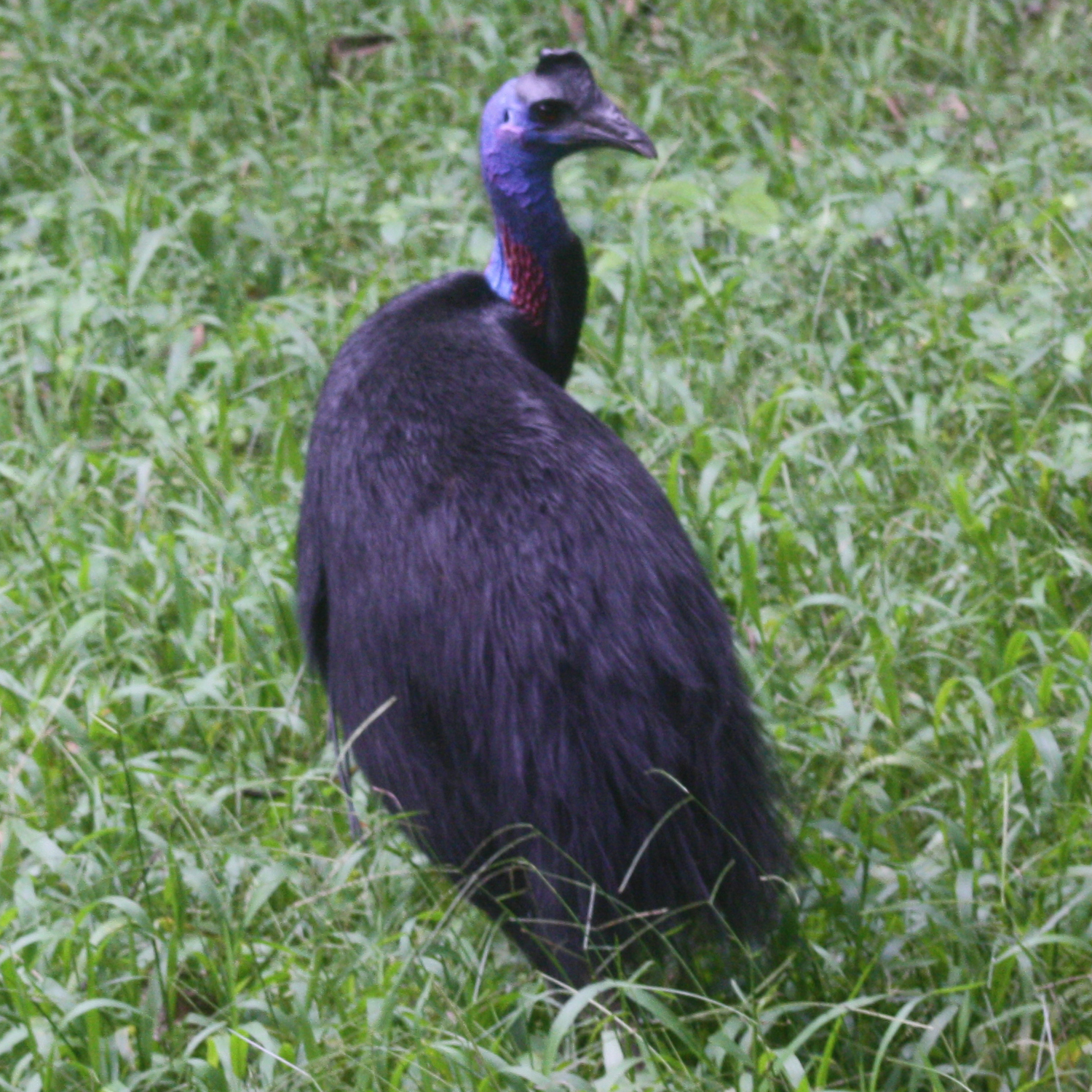
- Dwarf cassowary in Lae, Papua New Guinea

Conservation status
- Least Concern (IUCN 3.1)

Scientific classification
- Kingdom: Animalia
- Phylum: Chordata
- Class: Aves
- Infraclass: Palaeognathae
- Order: Casuariiformes
- Family: Casuariidae
- Genus: Casuarius
- Species: C. bennetti

Binomial name
- Casuarius bennetti Gould, 1857

Subspecies
- C. b. bennetti Gould, 1857; C. b. westermanni Sclater, 1874
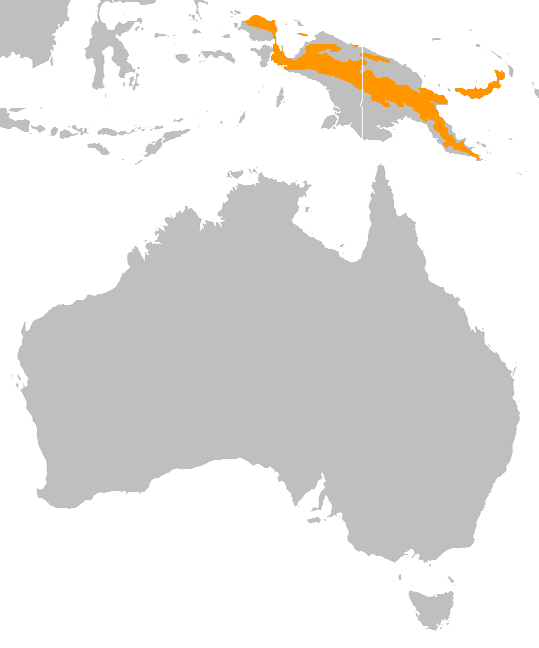
- Distribution of the dwarf cassowary

Synonyms
- List: Casuarius bennetti westermannirogersi (Sclater, 1874); Casuarius westermanni Sclater, 1874; Casuarius papuanus Schlegel, 1871; Casuarius bennetti papuanus (Schlegel, 1871); Casuarius goodfellowi Rothschild, 1914; Casuarius bennetti goodfellowi (Rothschild, 1914); Casuarius papuanus goodfellowi (Rothschild, 1914); Casuarius papuanus shawmayeri Rothschild, 1937; Casuarius bennetti shawmayeri (Rothschild, 1937); Casuarius foersteri Rothschild, 1913; Casuarius bennetti foersteri (Rothschild, 1913); Casuarius picticollis hecki Rothschild, 1899; Casuarius bennetti hecki (Rothschild, 1899); Casuarius keysseri Rothschild, 1912; Casuarius bennetti keysseri (Rothschild, 1912); Casuarius jamrachi Rothschild, 1904; Casuarius roseigularis Rothschild. 1905; Casuarius bennetti roseigularis (Rothschild, 1905); Casuarius rogersi Rothschild, 1928; Casuarius edwardsi Oustalet, 1878; Casuarius bennetti edwardsi (Oustalet, 1878); Casuarius westermanni edwardsi (Oustalet, 1878); Casuarius claudii Ogilvie-Grant, 1911; Casuarius bennetti claudii (Ogilvie-Grant, 1911); Casuarius picticollis Sclater, 1874; Casuarius bennetti picticollis (Sclater, 1874); Casuarius loriae Rothschild, 1898; Casuarius bennetti loriae (Rothschild, 1898); Casuarius maculatus Rothschild, 1900; Casuarius bennetti maculatus (Rothschild, 1900)

= Dwarf cassowary =

Species of flightless ratite bird

The dwarf cassowary (Casuarius bennetti), also known as Bennett's cassowary, little cassowary, mountain cassowary or muruk, is the smallest of the three extant species of cassowaries. Like all cassowaries, it is a mostly black, large flightless bird. It inhabits the island of New Guinea and the Bismarck Archipelago.

== Taxonomy ==
The scientific name commemorates the Australian naturalist George Bennett. He was the first scientist to examine these birds after a few were brought to Australia aboard a ship. Recognising them as a new species of cassowary, he sent specimens back to England, where other taxonomists confirmed his perception. On the west side of Cenderawasih Bay, western Papua, there is a distinctive form that may merit a split. C. papuanus is the tentative name. There are two recognized subspecies

- Casuarius bennetti bennetti - found throughout New Guinea except the Vogelkop Peninsula, as well as Yapen Island and New Britain
- Casuarius bennetti westermanni - found on the Vogelkop Peninsula

A third subspecies, Casuarius bennetti papuanus, may exist based on a specimen collected in 1875 of unknown origin. This name is sometimes applied to C. b. westermanni subspecies, and may represent a distinct species, but the taxonomy is still unresolved.

The Karam or Kalam people of the New Guinea Highlands classify bats and flying birds as one group, yaket, and the cassowaries, very large, wingless, flightless birds as another, kobtiy. Yaket are bony with wings and fly in the air, while kobtiy are bony without wings and are terrestrial and of the forest. They distinguish kobtiy from other bony, wingless animals because kobtiy are not quadrupedal like dogs and lizards and are not limbless like snakes. (See Kalam languages.)

John Gould first identified the dwarf cassowary from a specimen from New Britain, in 1857.

== Description ==
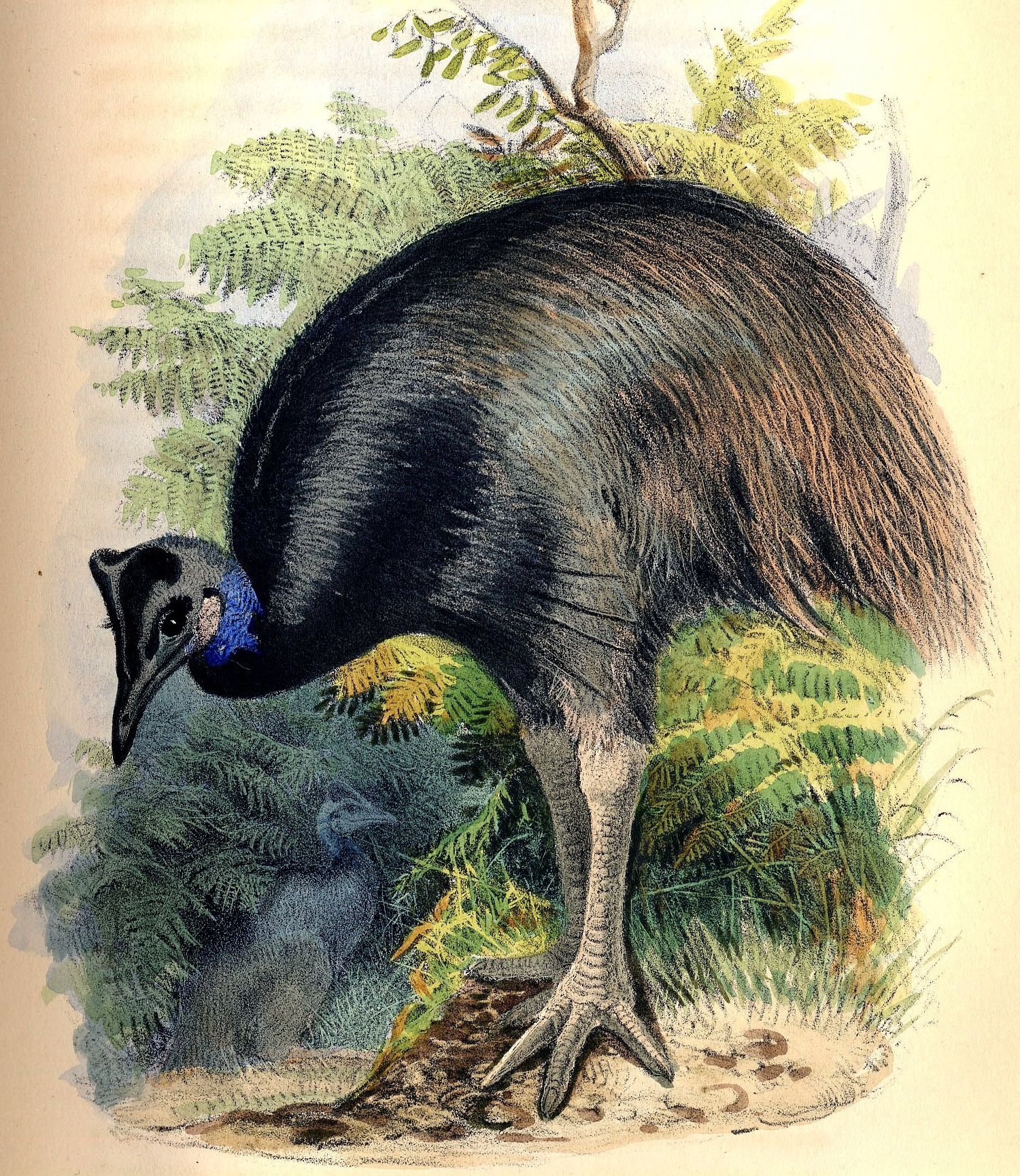
Drawing from Gatherings of a naturalist in Australasia by George Bennett (1860)

The dwarf cassowary is a large flightless bird but is smaller than other living cassowaries (the southern cassowary and northern cassowary). It stands 80 cm (2.6 ft) tall at the back, and 99–135 cm (3.25–4.43 ft) in total height. In length, it measures 100–150 cm (3.3–4.9 ft). They can weigh between 17.6 and 35 kg (39 and 77 lb).

The dwarf cassowary has hard and stiff black plumage, a low triangular casque, pink cheek and red patches of skin on its blue neck. Compared to other cassowaries, the dwarf cassowary is shorter, with a tarsi length of 24.5 cm (9.6 in), with a slightly smaller bill, at 11 to 12.2 cm (4.3 to 4.8 in). The feet are large and powerful, equipped with dagger-like claws on the inner toe, up to 10 cm (3.9 in) long. Both sexes are similar, but females have longer casques, brighter bare skin colour and are larger in size. The casques of dwarf cassowaries tends to be jet black, and unlike both the southern and northern cassowary, the casque of the dwarf cassowary does not glow under UV light.

== Range and habitat ==
Close up of head

The dwarf cassowary is endemic to the montane cloud forests and tropical rainforests of the island of New Guinea (divided between the countries of Indonesia and Papua New Guinea). Though the birds are primarily found on the island of New Guinea proper, they are also known from the Bismarck Archipelago (part of Papua New Guinea's Islands Region), including the islands of New Britain and New Ireland, as well as Yapen Island (part of Indonesia's Papua Province), at elevations of around 3,300 m (10,800 ft) above sea level. In areas where dwarf cassowaries do not encounter the northern cassowary (Casuarius unappendiculatus) nor the southern (Casuarius casuarius) species—i.e., avoiding interspecific competition—they will naturally become more confident and forage in lowland or open forest areas. The dwarf cassowary's total population is distributed over an area of approximately 258,000 km^{2} (100,000 sq mi).

== Ecology ==
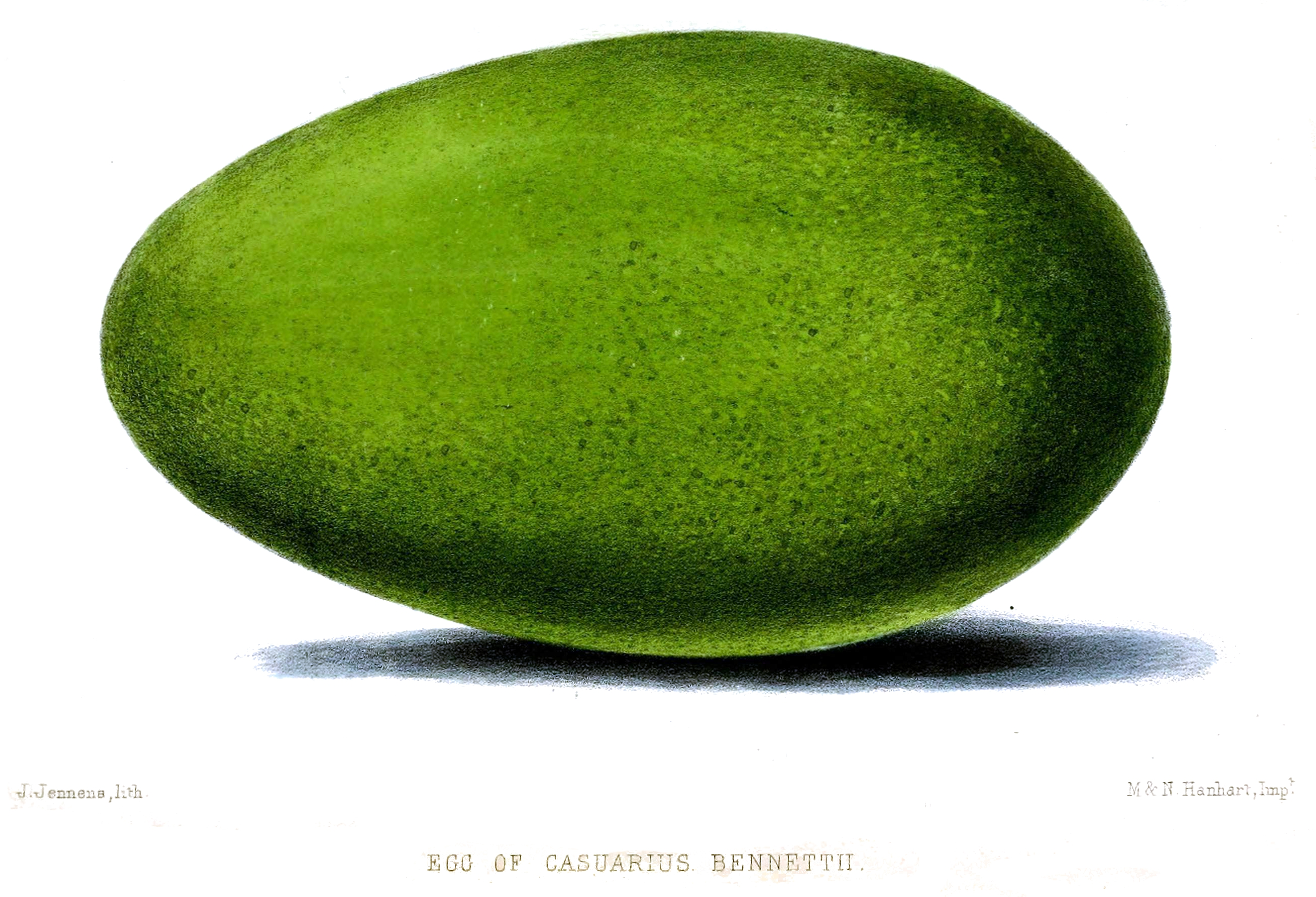
Egg of Dwarf Cassowary

Chick

The species feeds mainly on fallen fruits or fruits that they pluck from shrubs, invertebrates, small vertebrates, and fungi. Dwarf cassowaries use the crest on their head to sort through leaf litter and reveal many sources of food, such as fungi, insects, plant tissue, and small vertebrates, including lizards and frogs. It forages solitary or in small family groups; around good food sources, larger groups may form. It possibly undertakes seasonal migrations in part of its range, but is sometimes presumed sedentary.

=== Breeding ===
Breeding has been documented both during the wet and dry season. The nest is a shallow depression on the ground, with 2 to 5 eggs per clutch. These eggs measure 12.8–15.2 cm (5.0–6.0 in) in length and 8.1–9.5 cm (3.2–3.7 in) in width, weighing 625–640 g (1.378–1.411 lb). Incubation takes 49–52 days, and is done exclusively by the male, along with raising the chicks.

== Conservation ==
The dwarf cassowary has been classified as Near Threatened by the IUCN from 2004 to 2013 due to pressure by habitat loss, habitat degradation, being hunted for food, and often being kept in captivity. However, the species was downgraded to Least Concern in 2015, as current populations appear to be stable (although population trends remain generally unknown) and there is substantially less hunting pressure than in the past.
