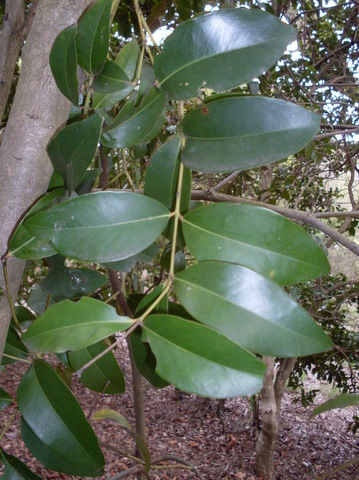
- Syzygium hemilamprum, formerly Acmena hemilampra

Scientific classification
- Kingdom: Plantae
- Clade: Tracheophytes
- Clade: Angiosperms
- Clade: Eudicots
- Clade: Rosids
- Order: Myrtales
- Family: Myrtaceae
- Subfamily: Myrtoideae
- Tribe: Syzygieae
- Genus: Acmena; DC.

Species
- See text

= Acmena =

Genus of flowering plants

Acmena was formerly the name of a genus of shrubs and trees in the myrtle family Myrtaceae. The genus was first formally described in 1828 by Augustin Pyramus de Candolle in his Prodromus Systematis Naturalis Regni Vegetabilis.

The species included:

- Acmena divaricata, now a synonym of Syzygium divaricatum (Merr. & L.M.Perry) Craven & Biffin
- Acmena graveolens, now a synonym of Syzygium graveolens (F.M.Bailey) Craven & Biffin
- Acmena hemilampra, now a synonym of Syzygium hemilamprum (F.Muell.) Craven & Biffin
- Acmena ingens, now a synonym of Syzygium ingens (F.Muell. ex C.Moore) Craven & Biffin
- Acmena macrocarpa, now a synonym of Syzygium graveolens (F.M.Bailey) Craven & Biffin
- Acmena resa, now a synonym of Syzygium resa (B.Hyland) Craven & Biffin
- Acmena smithii, now a synonym of Syzygium smithii (Poir.) Nied.
