= Iluka Nature Reserve =

Nature reserve of New South Wales, Australia

- IUCN category IV (habitat/species management area)
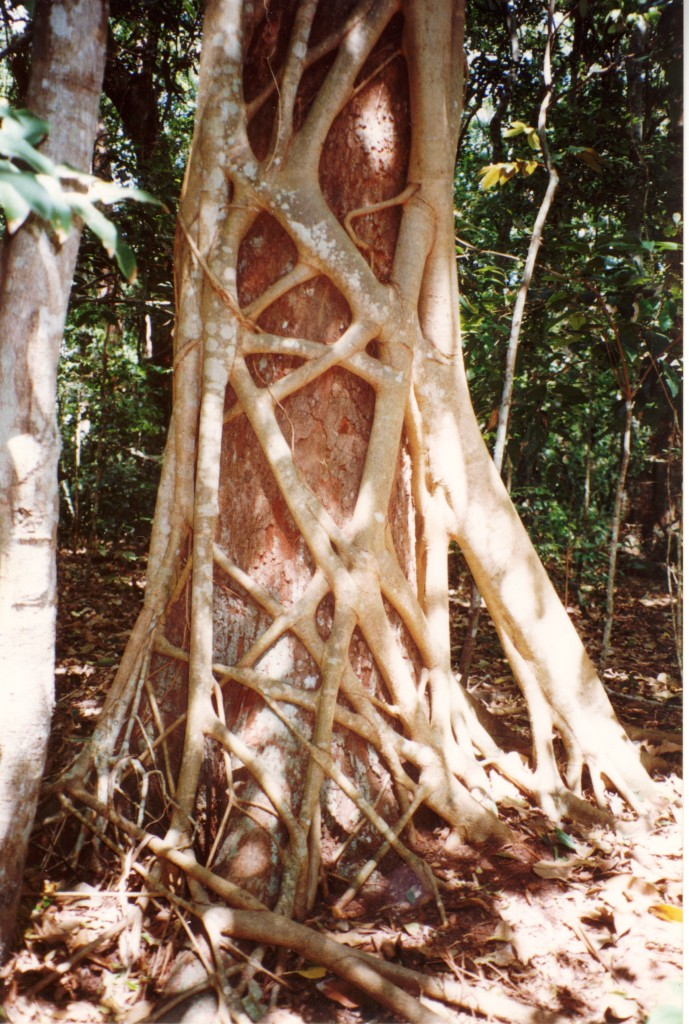
- Strangler Fig on Syzygium hemilampra in the reserve.

- Location within New South Wales
- Location: New South Wales
- Nearest city: Iluka
- Coordinates: 29°24′14″S 153°21′44″E
- Area: 1.35 km^{2} (0.52 sq mi)
- Established: July 1976
- Governing body: NSW National Parks and Wildlife Service
- Website: Official website

The Iluka Nature Reserve in a protected nature reserve in the Northern Rivers region of New South Wales, Australia. The 135-hectare (330-acre) reserve is situated near the coastal town of Iluka. The average elevation of the terrain above sea level is 6 meters.

The littoral rainforest, one of the last remaining in the Southern Hemisphere, is part of the Coastal group of the UNESCO World Heritage–listed Gondwana Rainforests, inscribed in 1986. The reserve was added to the Australian National Heritage List in 2007. It contains many different plant species ranging from coastal dune species to tropical rainforest species. The Iluka rainforest has a vast range of native animal species ranging from wallabies and kangaroos to wombats and echidnas. Iluka is known for the rare coastal emu.

This nature reserve is very popular with bird watchers. Over 140 species of birds have been recorded here.

== See also ==
- Broadwater National Park
- Bundjalung National Park
- Protected areas of New South Wales
