= Strangler fig =

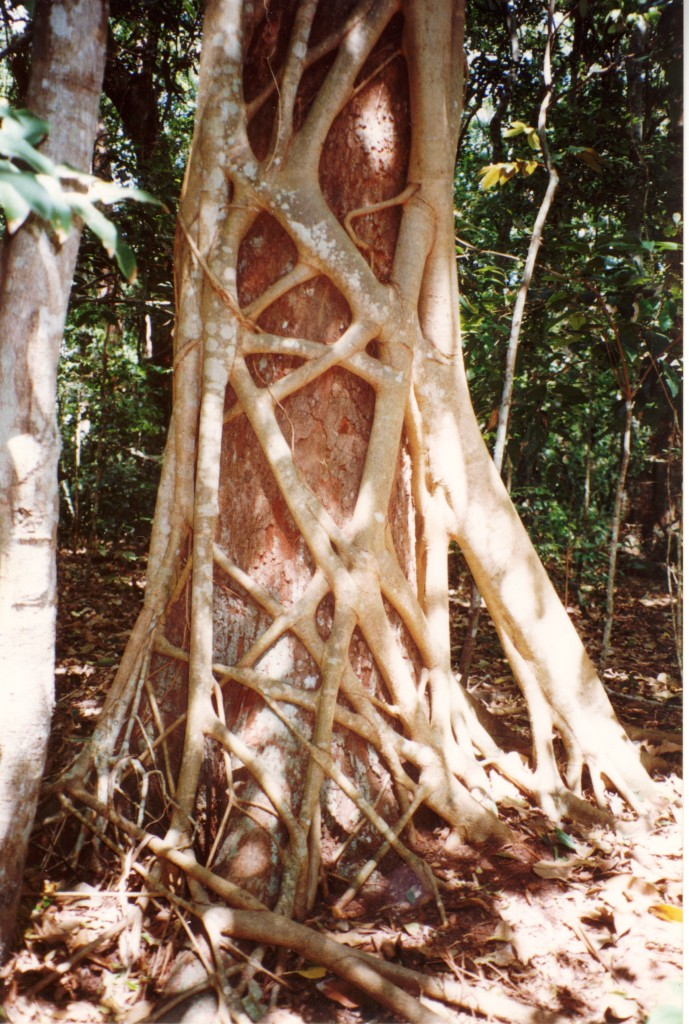
Ficus watkinsiana on Syzygium hemilampra, Australia

Strangler fig is the common name for a number of tropical and subtropical plant species in the genus Ficus, including those that are commonly known as banyans.

== Species ==
Some of the more well-known species are:

- Ficus altissima – southern China and tropical Asia
- Ficus aurea – Florida, the Caribbean and Central America
- Ficus benghalensis – Indian subcontinent
- Ficus benjamina – tropical and subtropical Asia to northern Australia
- Ficus burtt-davyi – southeastern Africa
- Ficus citrifolia – Florida and tropical America
- Ficus craterostoma – tropical and southern Africa
- Ficus henneana – northern and eastern Australia
- Ficus macrophylla – eastern Australia and Lord Howe Island
- Ficus microcarpa - southeast Asia to Australia
- Ficus obliqua – Maluku Islands, Papuasia, northern Australia and southwestern Pacific
- Ficus tinctoria – Indian subcontinent and southern China to northern Australia and southwestern Pacific
- Ficus virens – tropical and subtropical Asia to northern Australia and western Pacific
- Ficus watkinsiana – eastern Australia

These all share a common "strangling" growth habit that is found in many tropical forest species. This growth habit is an adaptation for growing in dark forests where the competition for light is intense. These plants are hemiepiphytes, spending the first part of their life without rooting into the ground. Their seeds, often bird-dispersed, germinate in crevices atop other trees. These seedlings grow their roots downward and envelop the host tree while also growing upward to reach into the sunlight zone above the canopy.

An original support tree can sometimes die, so that the strangler fig becomes a "columnar tree" with a hollow central core. However, it is also believed that the strangler fig can help its support tree survive storms.

== Uses ==
After many decades spent living outdoors in the rainforests of northern Queensland, Australia, hermetic bushman Michael 'Tarzan' Fomenko (c.1930–2018) settled upon sleeping amidst giant strangler fig roots. On occasions when black snakes, scrub turkeys and goannas were a threat or a nuisance, he would sleep up in the tree.

== Gallery ==
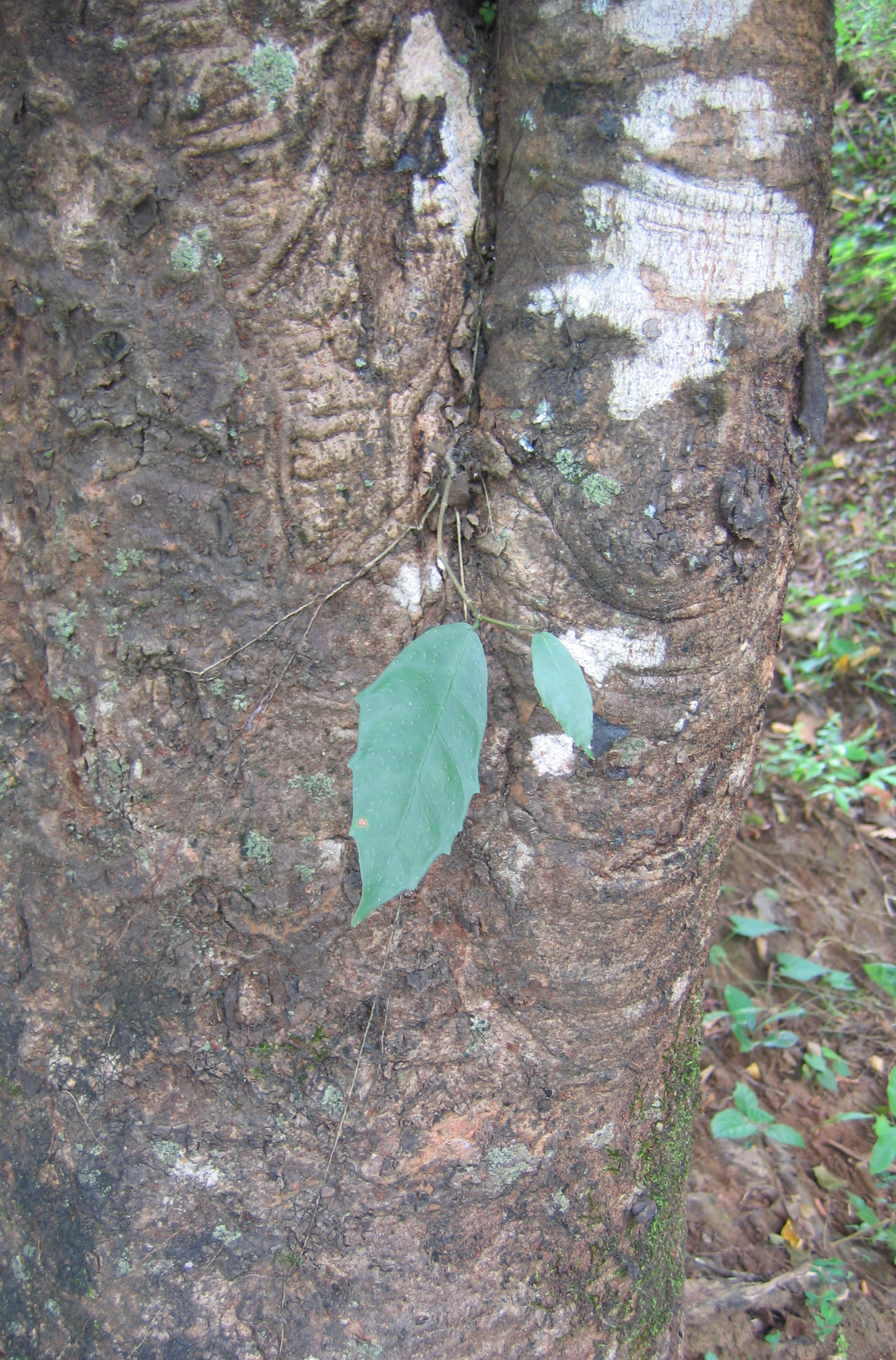
A fig seedling with thread-like roots on an unknown host

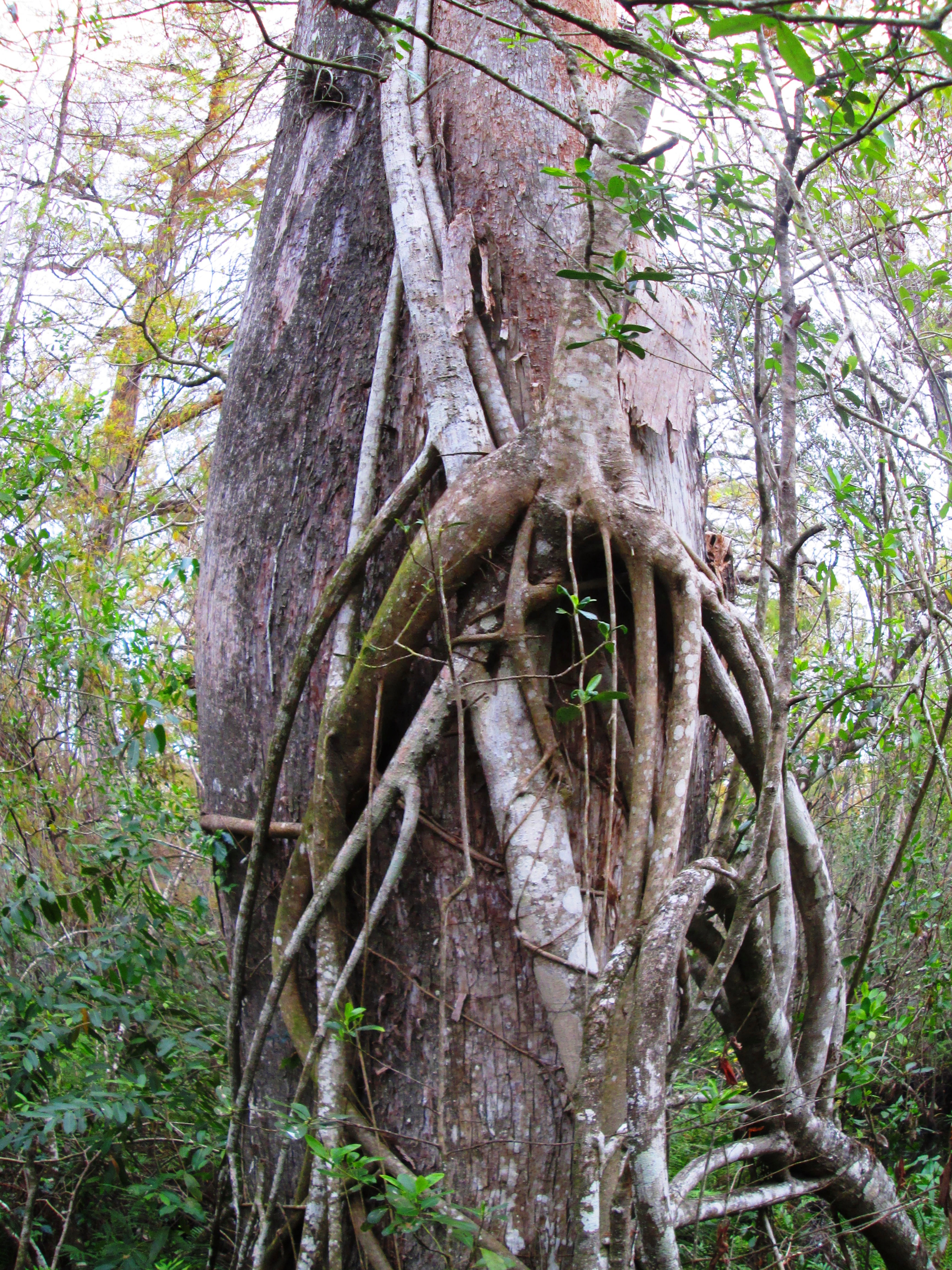
The trunk of a bald cypress, encircled by fig roots

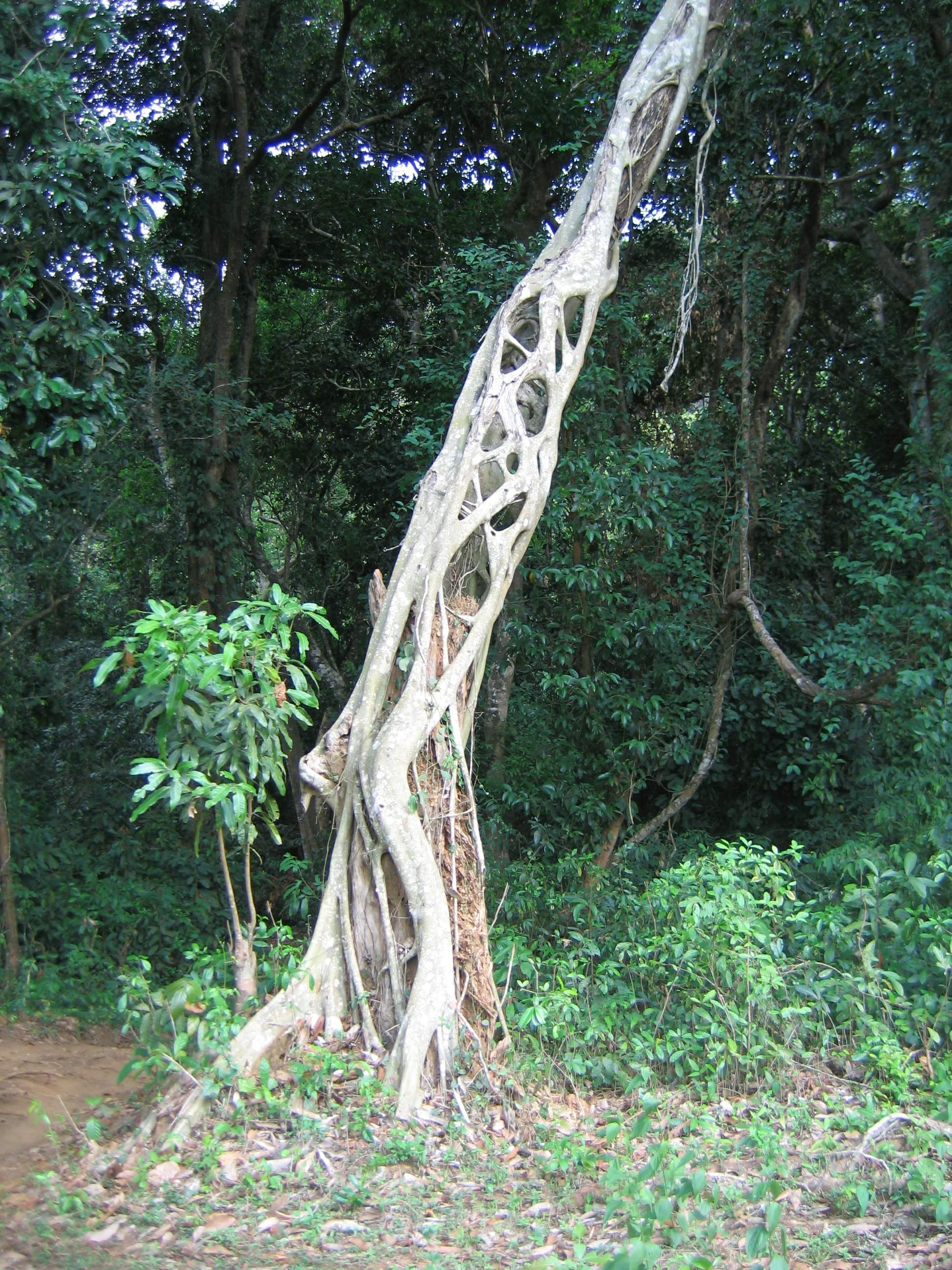
A strangler fig. The supporting tree, now dead, can also be seen

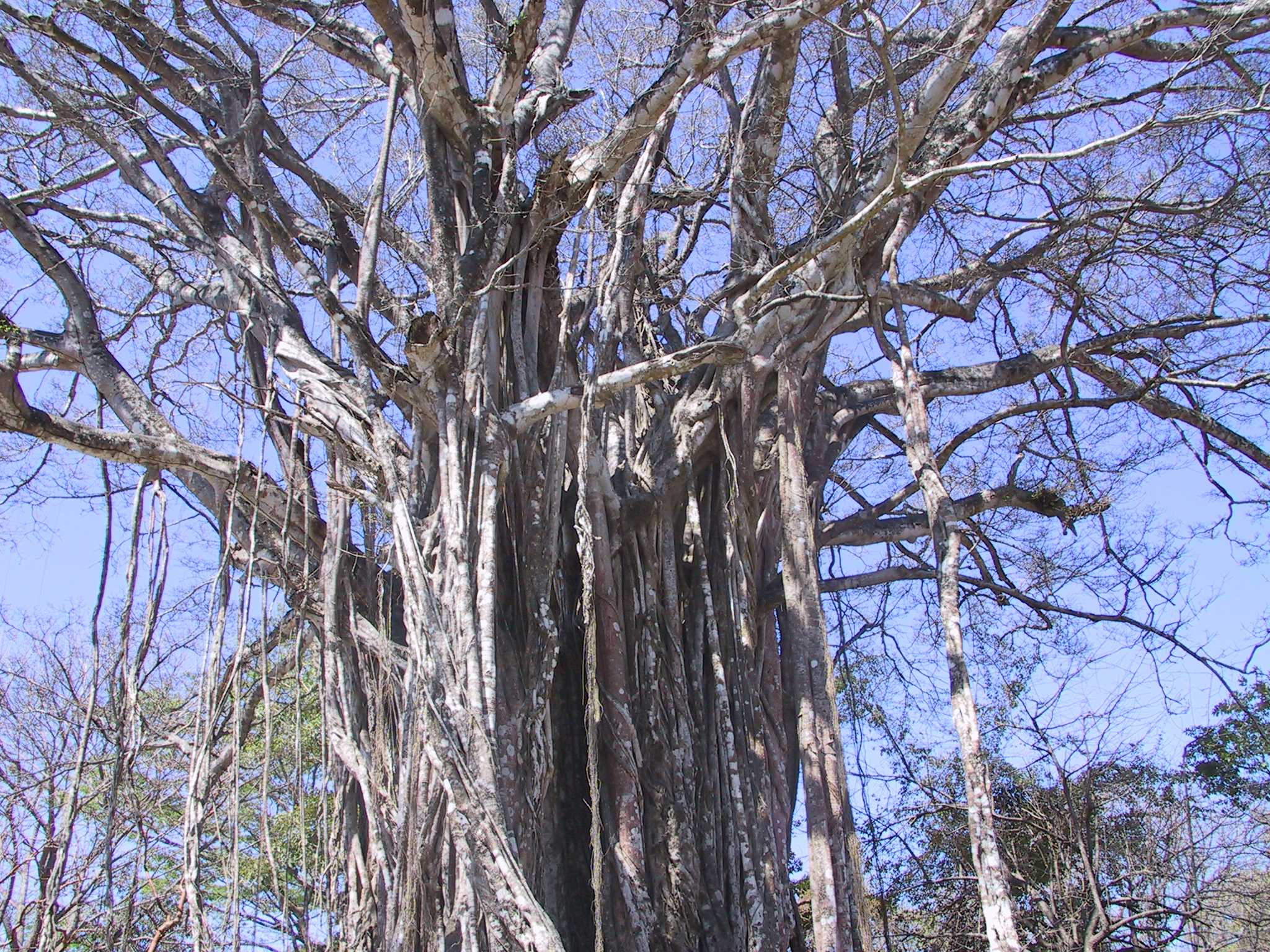
Mature fig standing above the surrounding forest

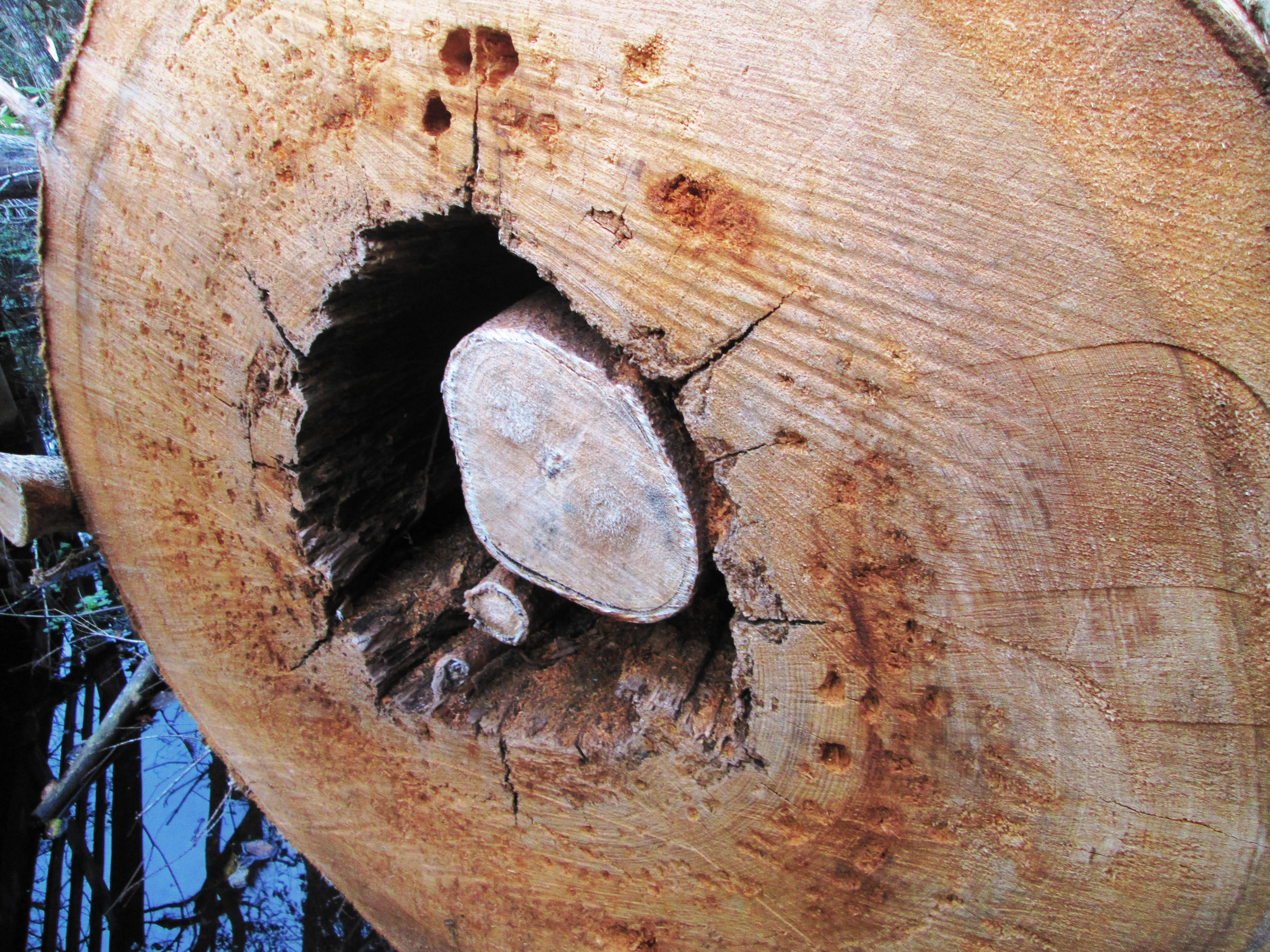
A cross section of a bald cypress at the Corkscrew Swamp Sanctuary, showing the fig roots inside it

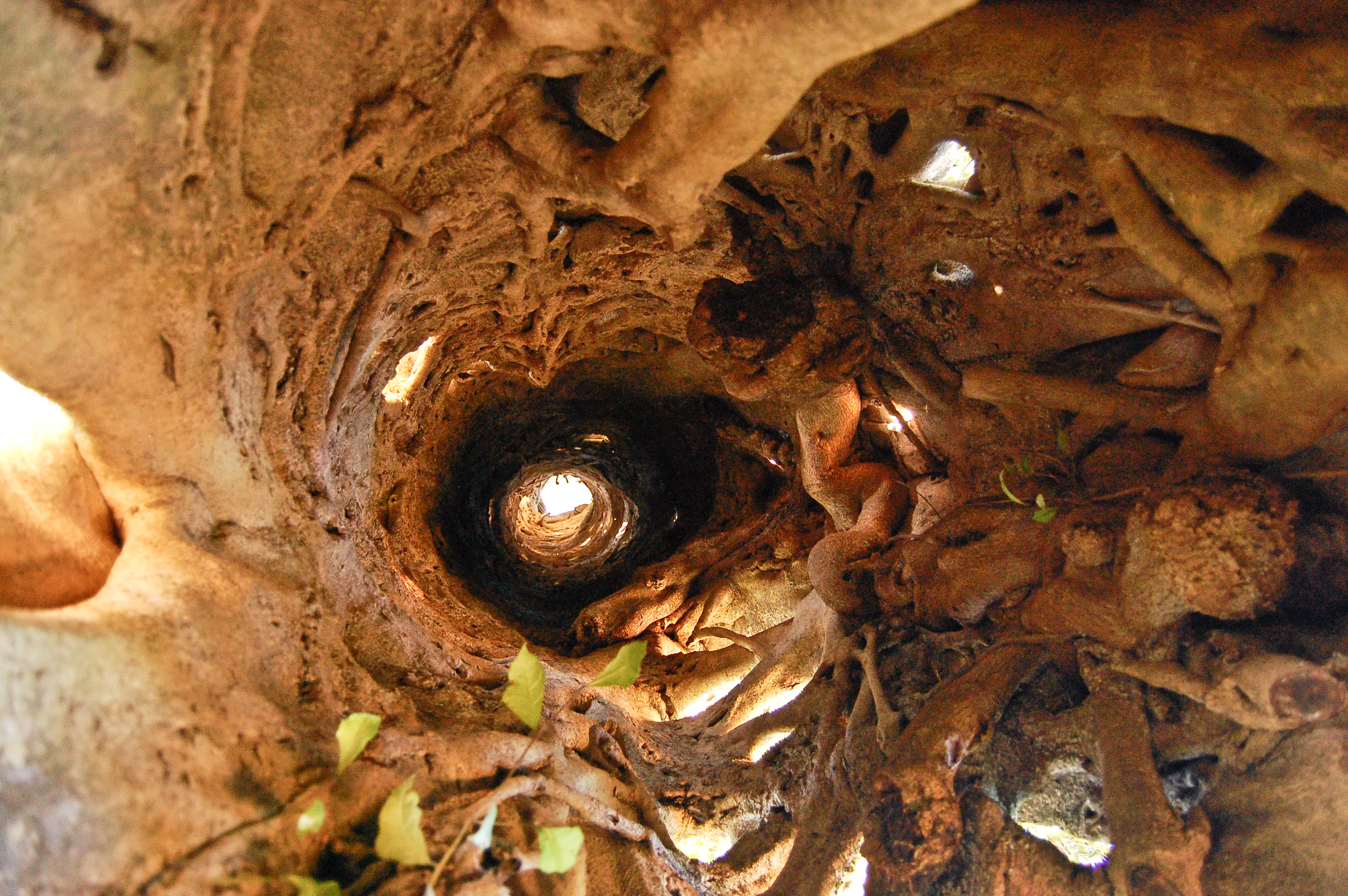
View looking through the hollow core of a fig after the host has died and rotted away
