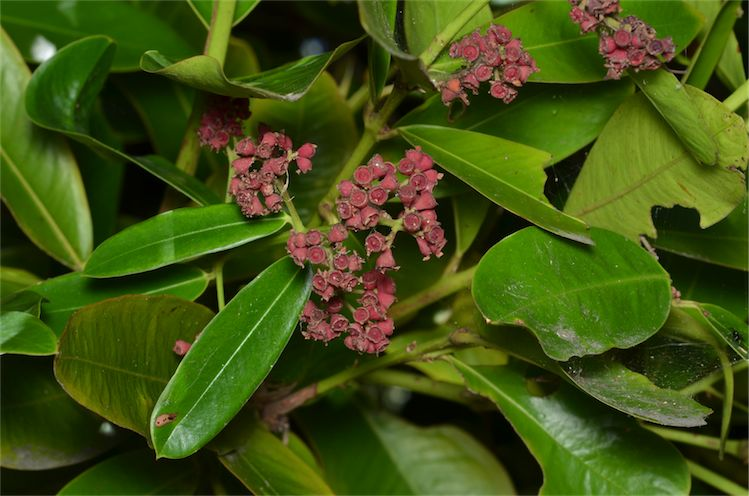

Conservation status
- Least Concern (NCA)

Scientific classification
- Kingdom: Plantae
- Clade: Embryophytes
- Clade: Tracheophytes
- Clade: Spermatophytes
- Clade: Angiosperms
- Clade: Eudicots
- Clade: Rosids
- Order: Myrtales
- Family: Myrtaceae
- Genus: Syzygium
- Species: S. graveolens

Binomial name
- Syzygium graveolens (F.M.Bailey) Craven & Biffin (Note: The Queensland Herbarium treats this species as Acmena Graveolens)

Synonyms
- Cryptocarya graveolens F.M.Bailey; Acmena graveolens (F.M.Bailey) L.S.Sm. (Note: Accepted name in Queensland); Acmena macrocarpa C.T.White

= Syzygium graveolens =

Cassowary satinash

Species of flowering plant

Syzygium graveolens, commonly known as cassowary satinash, is a plant in the eucalyptus family Myrtaceae found only in the Wet Tropics bioregion of Queensland, Australia.

== Description ==
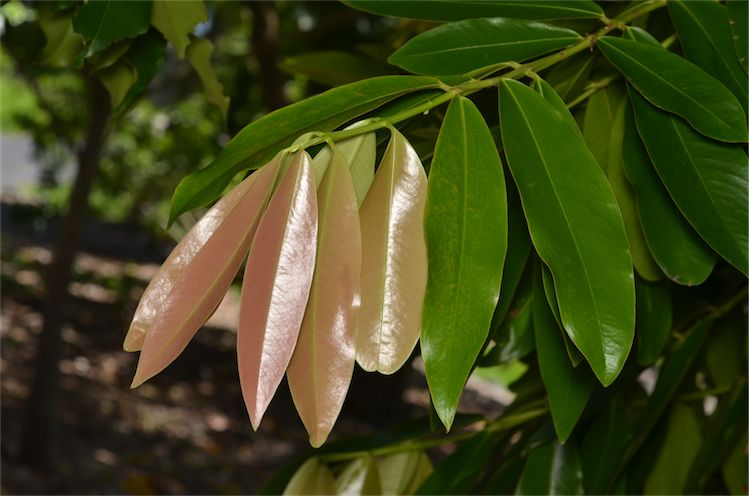
New leaf flush

Syzygium graveolens is a tree growing to 30 m (98 ft) tall and a diameter of up to 1 m (3 ft 3 in). The trunk is reddish or grey and the bark is scaly or flaky. Buttress roots are often present. The leaves are arranged in opposite pairs on the twigs and held on petioles (stalks) about 14 mm (0.55 in) long. They are glabrous (hairless), leathery and measure up to 22 cm (8.7 in) long by 8 cm (3.1 in) wide. The flowers have 4 or 5 white or cream petals about 2 mm (0.08 in) long and are fragrant. The fruit is, in botanical terms, a berry, pink or reddish and about 6 cm (2.4 in) in diameter. It contains a single seed about 4 cm (1.6 in) in diameter.

=== Phenology ===
Flowering occurs from January to June, and fruits mature between April and November.

== Taxonomy ==
This species was first described in 1891 by Frederick Manson Bailey as Cryptocarya graveolens (family Lauraceae). Bailey did not have samples of the flowers, and it is thought that he had some doubt about his placement of the plant in this family. In 1956 the species was transferred to the genus Acmena (Myrtaceae) by Lindsay Stuart Smith. In 2006, in a review of several closely related genera in Myrtaceae conducted by Lyndley Alan Craven and Edward Sturt Biffin, the entire Acmena genus was transferred to Syzygium, giving this species its current combination Syzygium graveolens.

=== Etymology ===
The genus name Syzygium comes from the Ancient Greek sýzygos, meaning 'joined', 'yoked', or 'paired', and refers to the paired leaves. The species epithet graveolens is Latin for "strong smelling", which refers to the cut seeds.

== Distribution and habitat ==
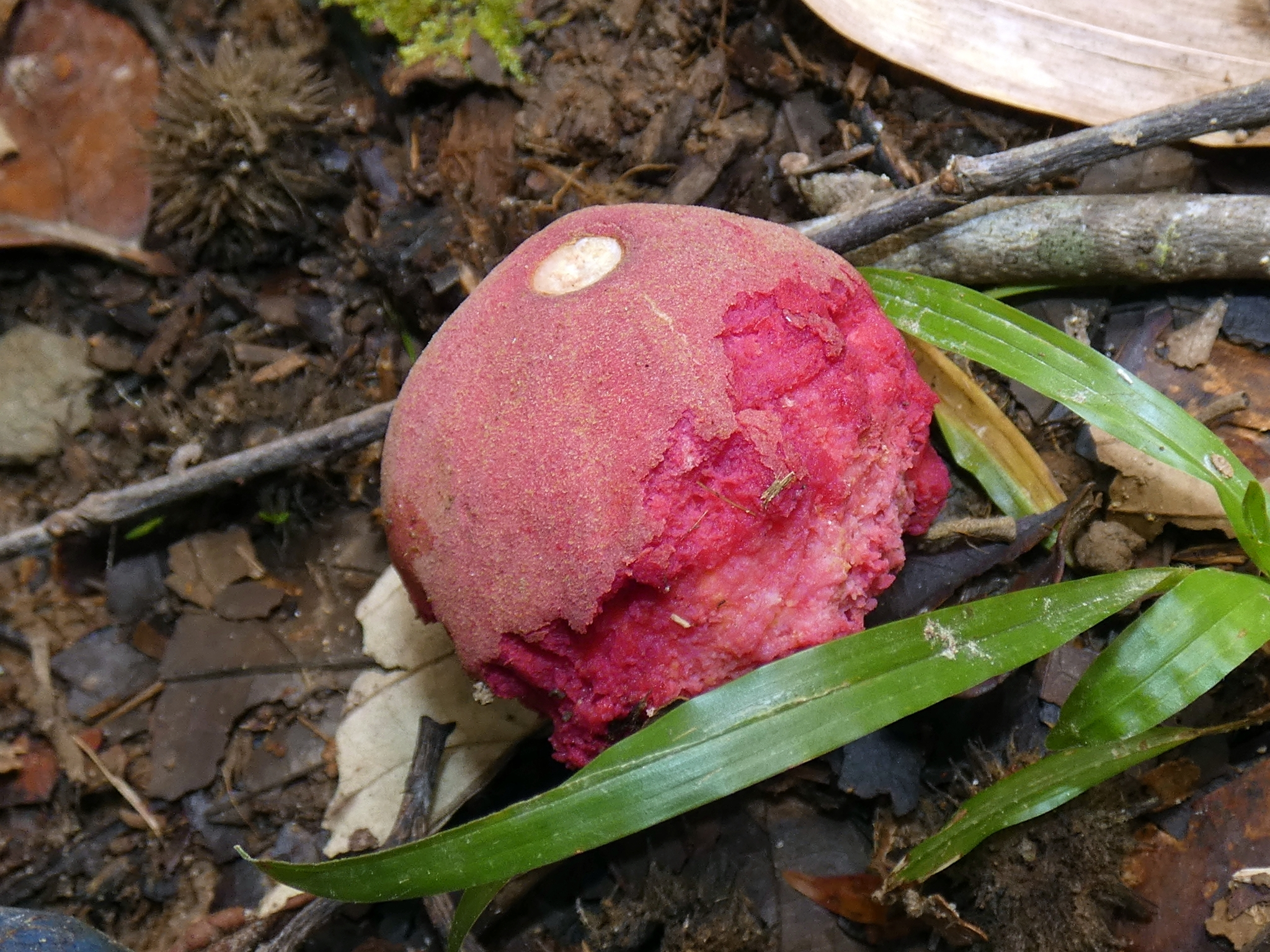
Fruit

The cassowary satinash is found only in coastal northeastern Queensland, from Cape Tribulation to about Tully. It grows in well developed rainforest at altitudes from sea level to about 500 m (1,600 ft).

== Ecology ==
Fruit of this species are eaten by cassowaries (Casuarius casuarius).

== Conservation ==
This species is listed as least concern under the Queensland Government's Nature Conservation Act. As of 26 August 2024, it has not been assessed by the International Union for Conservation of Nature (IUCN).
