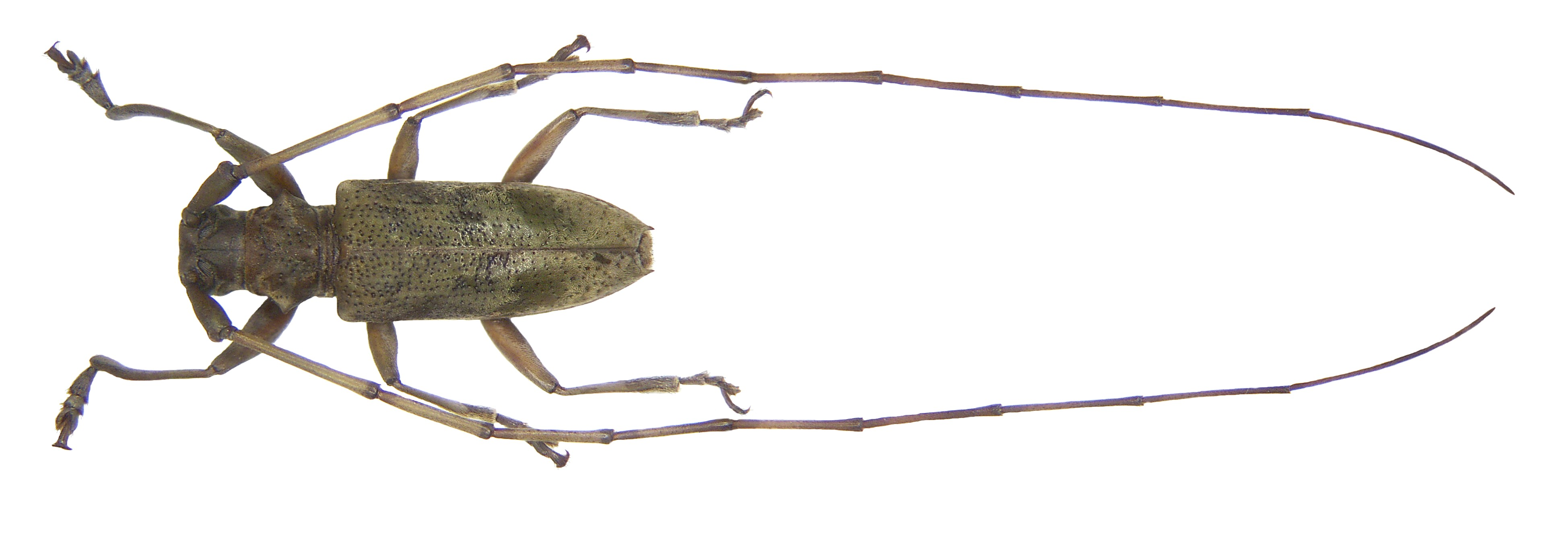

Scientific classification
- Kingdom: Animalia
- Phylum: Arthropoda
- Class: Insecta
- Order: Coleoptera
- Suborder: Polyphaga
- Infraorder: Cucujiformia
- Family: Cerambycidae
- Genus: Acalolepta
- Species: A. fasciata

Binomial name
- Acalolepta fasciata (Montrouzier, 1855)

Synonyms
- Acalolepta fasciata aurivaria (Gressitt, 1952); Dihammus fasciatus (Montrouzier, 1855); Dihammus fasciatus aurivarius Gressitt, 1952; Lamia (Monohammus) fasciata Montrouzier, 1855; Monochamus (Lamia) fasciata (Montrouzier, 1855); Monochamus captiosus Pascoe, 1866; Monochamus uraeus Pascoe, 1866; Dihammus magneticus (Pascoe); Monochamus acanthias (Pascoe)

= Acalolepta fasciata =

Species of beetle

Acalolepta fasciata is a species of longhorn beetle in the family Cerambycidae. It was described by Xavier Montrouzier in 1855. It is known from Papua New Guinea, Vanuatu, Indonesia, Samoa, Australia, the Solomon Islands, Moluccas, and possibly Sulawesi. It feeds on trees such as Hevea brasiliensis, Artocarpus altilis, and Ficus watkinsiana. It reaches a length of between 12 and 22 cm (4.7 and 8.7 in).
