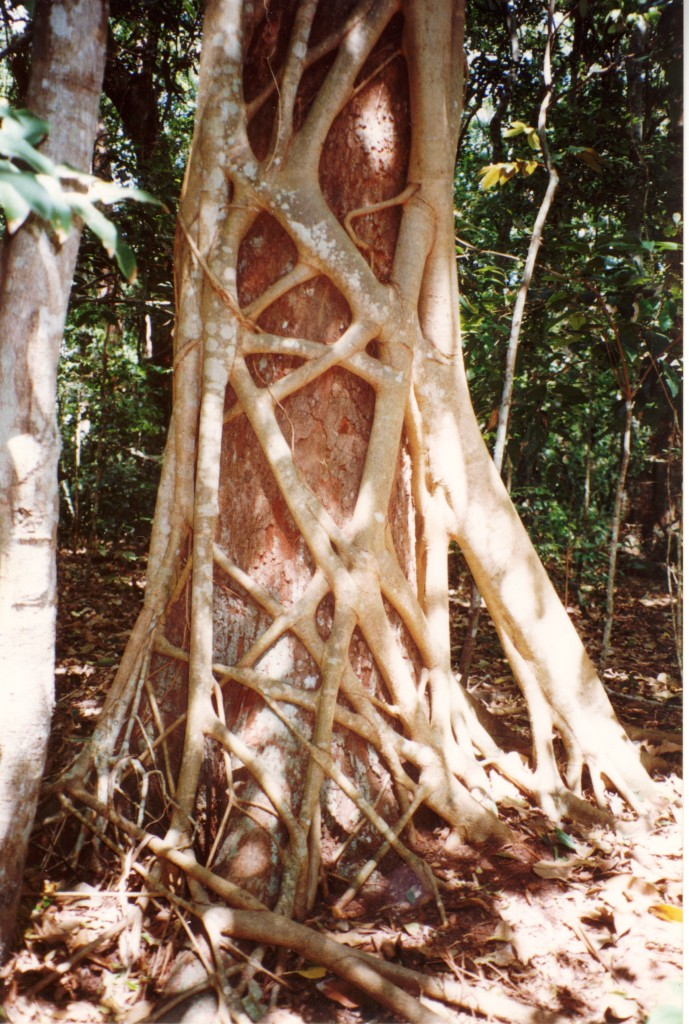
- Ficus watkinsiana on Syzygium hemilampra, Iluka, New South Wales

Conservation status
- Least Concern (IUCN 3.1)

Scientific classification
- Kingdom: Plantae
- Clade: Tracheophytes
- Clade: Angiosperms
- Clade: Eudicots
- Clade: Rosids
- Order: Rosales
- Family: Moraceae
- Genus: Ficus
- Species: F. watkinsiana

Binomial name
- Ficus watkinsiana F.M.Bailey

Synonyms
- Ficus bellingeri C.Moore; Ficus simmondsii F.M.Bailey

= Ficus watkinsiana =

Species of flowering plant

Ficus watkinsiana, commonly known as Watkins' fig, nipple fig or the green-leaved Moreton Bay fig is a rainforest strangler fig that is endemic to Australia. It occurs in two populations—one in northeast Queensland and the other in southeast Queensland and northeast New South Wales. It was first described in 1891, and has the conservation status of Least Concern.

== Description ==
Ficus watkinsiana is a hemiepiphyte which may grow up to about 60 m (200 ft) tall and 2 m (6 ft 7 in) diameter. It has smooth bark and may be buttressed. The leaf-bearing twigs are finely hairy and about 1 cm (0.4 in) diameter. The leaves are somewhat stiff and lanceolate in shape, measuring up to 20 cm (7.9 in) long and 7 cm (2.8 in) wide, and carried on petioles about 7 cm (2.8 in) long. They have 10–17 indistinct primary lateral veins and many more very faint secondary lateral veins, all of which join to form an intramarginal vein inside the leaf margin.

The syconia (fig fruit) are paired and grow from the leaf axils on short, broad peduncles. They are purplish brown to black in colour and bear lenticels on the surface. They are slightly longer than wide (about 4 cm (1.6 in) long by 3.5 cm (1.4 in) wide, with a nipple-like protrusion at the apex.

== Taxonomy ==
This species was first described by Australian botanist Frederick Manson Bailey, based on a number of specimens collected around southeast Queensland. It was published in Bailey's continuing work Contributions to the Queensland Flora.

=== Etymology ===
The species epithet watkinsiana was chosen to honour George Watkins, who was an "ardent collector" of plants in Queensland at the time.

== Distribution and habitat ==
Ficus watkinsiana occurs in two disjunct populations: one is found in northeastern Queensland from the Windsor Tablelands southwards to the area around Paluma Range National Park, the other population occurs from near Bundaberg, Queensland, to about Lismore, New South Wales.

The tree inhabits rainforest, where it is often found on basaltic soils. It grows in upland forest – in north Queensland it mostly occurs above 700 m (2,300 ft).

== Ecology ==
Fruit of this tree are eaten by spectacled flying foxes (Pteropus conspicillatus) and many species of birds, including the southern cassowary (Casuarius casuarius).

In all Ficus species, the flowers are pollinated by a wasp species of the family Agaonidae, with each fig species often being pollinated by a single species of wasp, and each wasp species pollinating a single species of fig. This is an extreme form of symbiosis known as "obligate mutualism", in which the two species involved are entirely dependant on each other for their own survival. In the case of Ficus watkinsiana, the sole pollinator in Australia is Pleistodontes nigriventris, however, research has shed new light on this relationship. On the island of Kauai in Hawaii numerous exotic fig species have been cultivated, including F. watkinsiana and another closely related Australian species, F. rubiginosa. The pollinator wasp for the latter, Pleistodontes imperialis was found in figs of F. watkinsiana, indicating that the mutual relationships of figs and wasps may be upset under some circumstances.

== Gallery ==
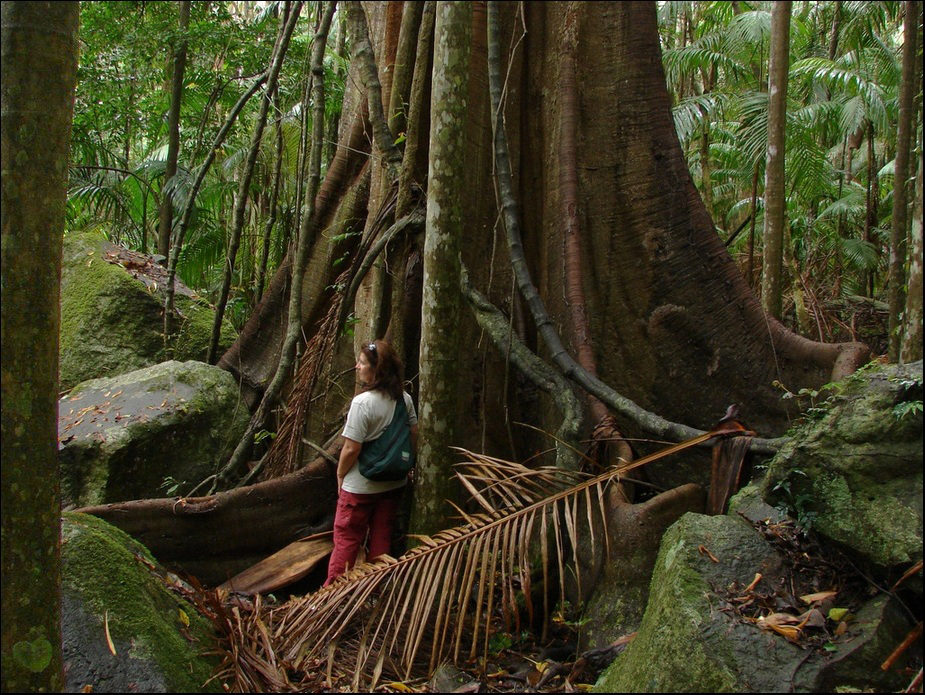
Buttress roots

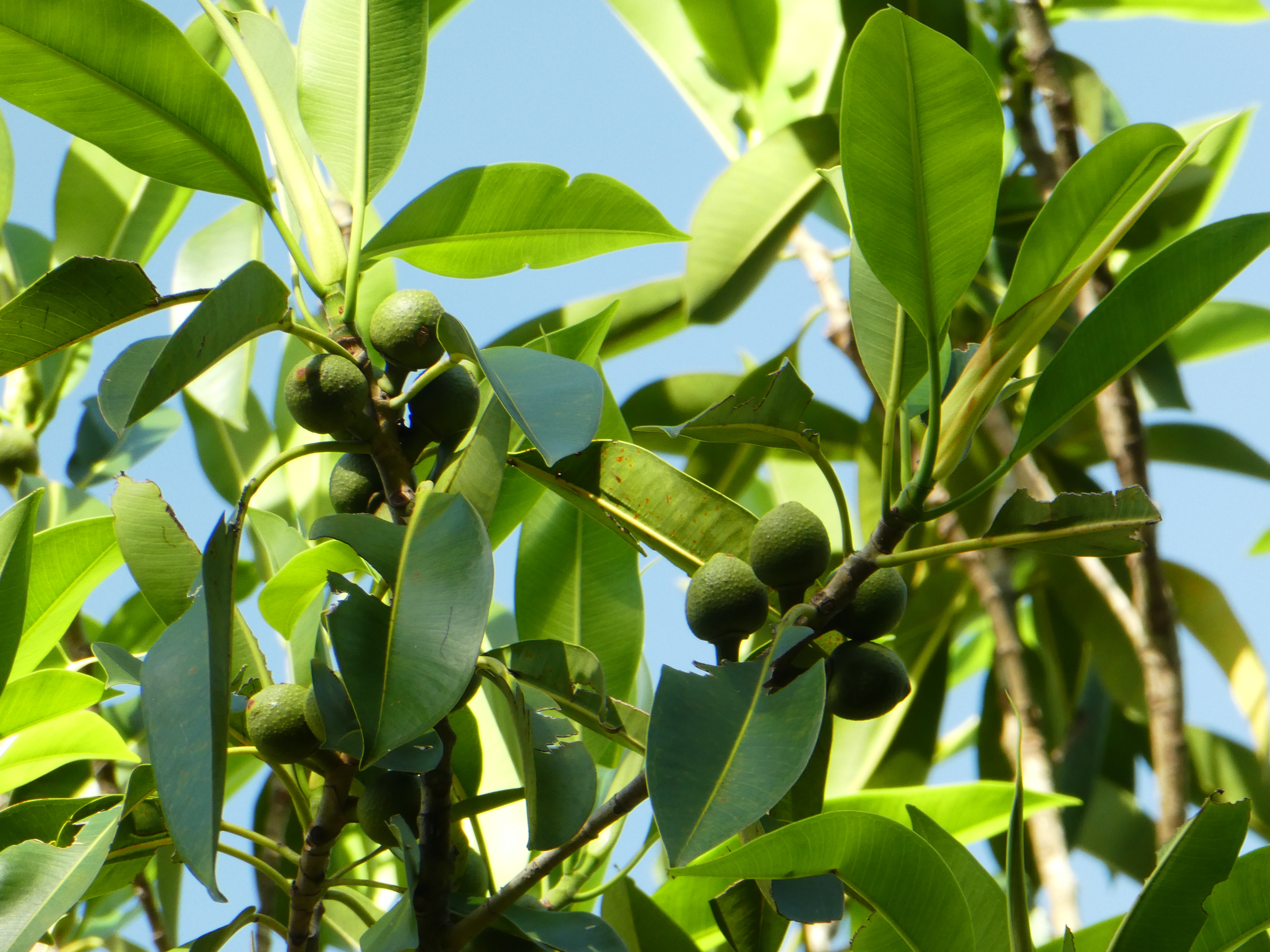
Foliage and immature fruit

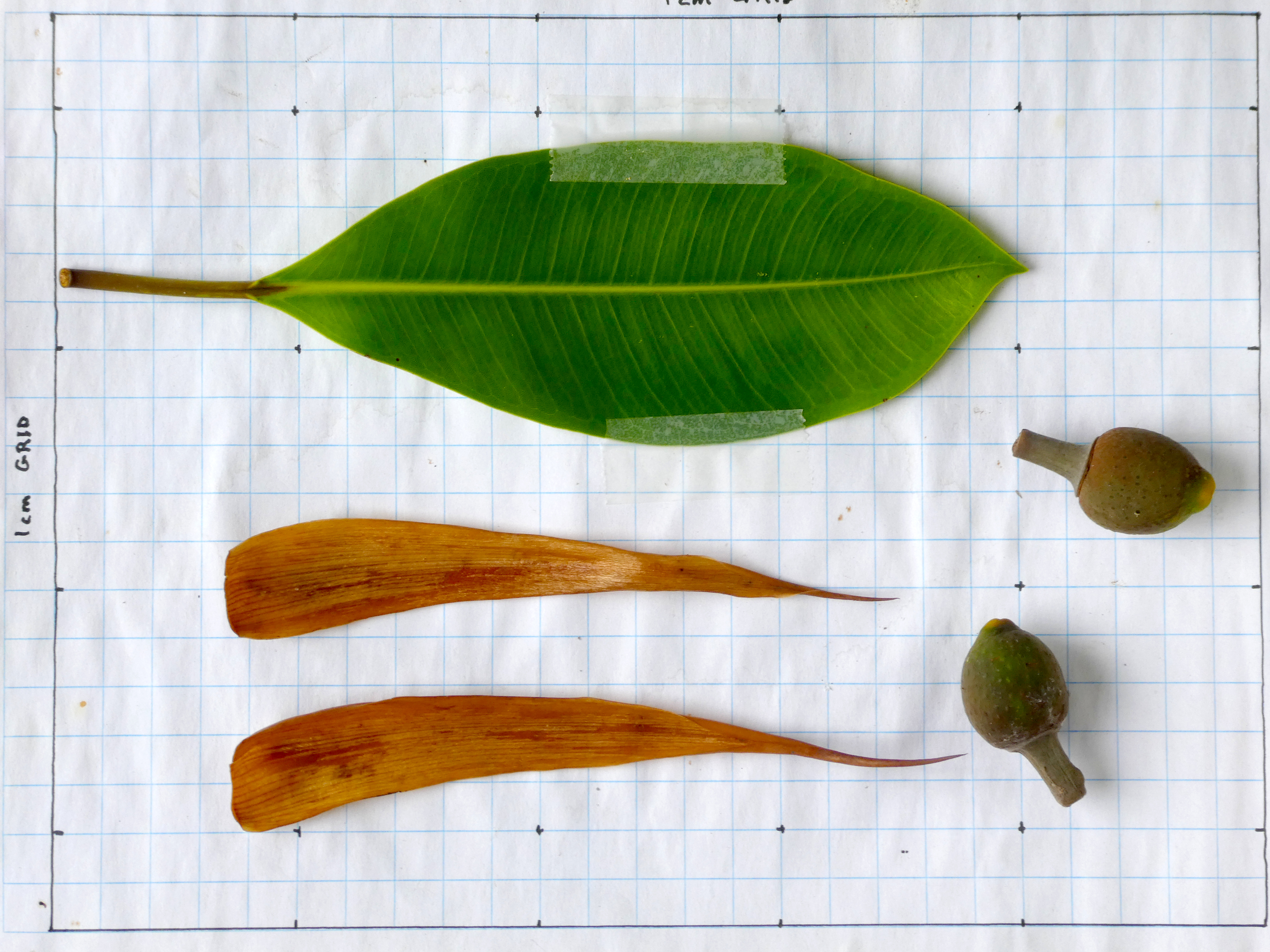
Leaf, stipules, fruit

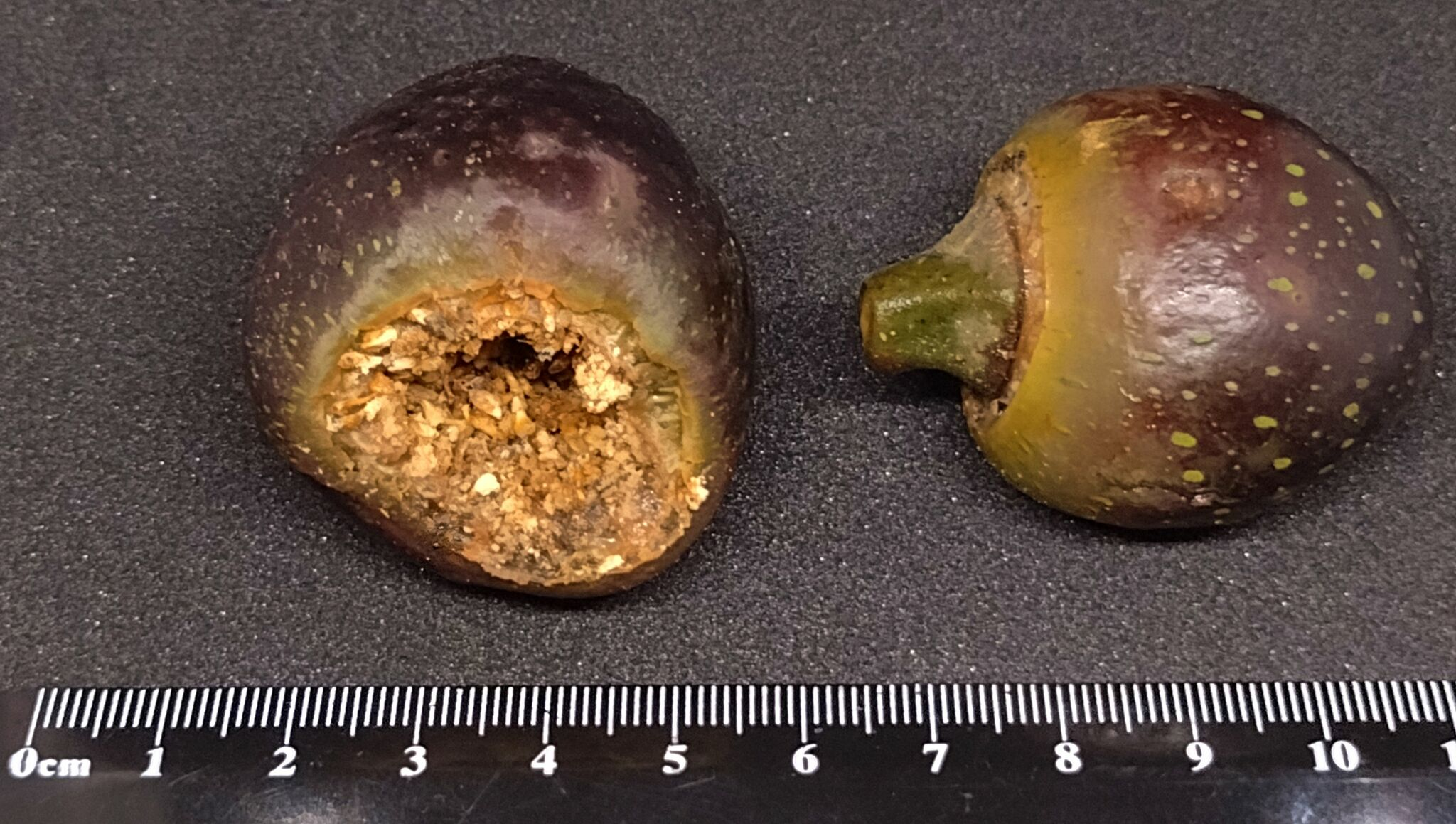
Fruit
