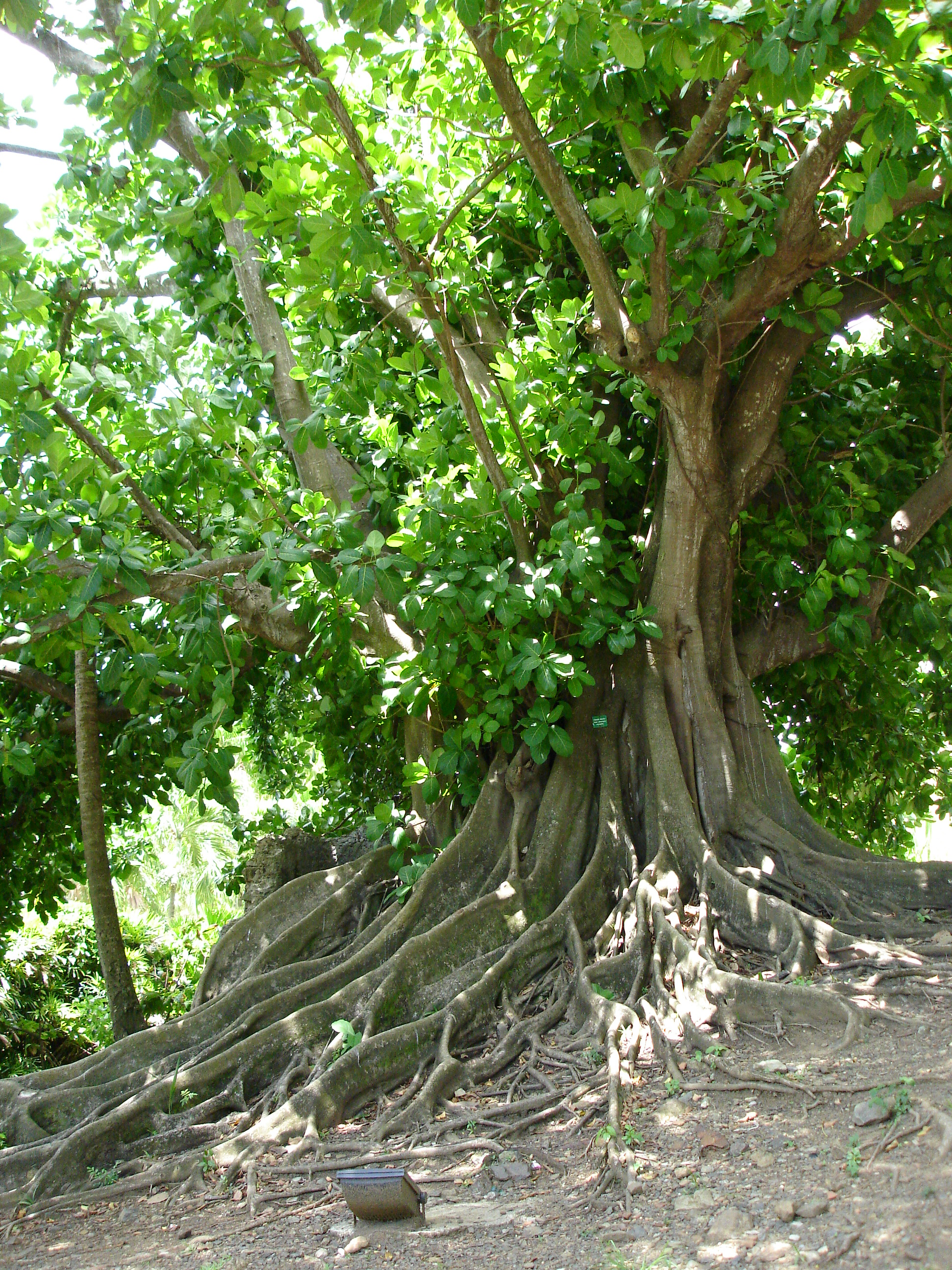

Conservation status
- Least Concern (IUCN 3.1)

Scientific classification
- Kingdom: Plantae
- Clade: Tracheophytes
- Clade: Angiosperms
- Clade: Eudicots
- Clade: Rosids
- Order: Rosales
- Family: Moraceae
- Genus: Ficus
- Subgenus: F. subg. Urostigma
- Species: F. citrifolia

Binomial name
- Ficus citrifolia Mill.

Synonyms
- Synonymy: Caprificus gigantea (Kunth) Gasp.; Ficus antimanensis Pittier; Ficus botryapioides Kunth & C.D.Bouché; Ficus brevifolia Nutt.; Ficus caribaea Jacq.; Ficus catesbaei Steud.; Ficus citrifolia var. brevifolia (Nutt.) D'Arcy; Ficus citrifolia subsp. brevifolia (Nutt.) A.E.Murray; Ficus eximia var. cubensis Miq.; Ficus eximia f. paraguariensis Hassl.; Ficus foveata Pittier; Ficus foveolata Pittier ex Tamayo 1941 not (Wall. ex Miq.) Wall. ex Miq. 1867; Ficus gentlei Lundell; Ficus gigantea Kunth; Ficus guanarensis Pittier; Ficus guaranitica Chodat; Ficus laevigata Vahl; Ficus laevigata var. brevifolia (Nutt.) Rossberg; Ficus laevigata var. genuina Urb.; Ficus laevigata var. hispaniolae (Warb.) Rossberg; Ficus laevigata var. lentiginosa (Vahl) Urb.; Ficus lentiginosa Vahl; Ficus lentiginosa var. imrayana Domin; Ficus lentiginosa var. subcuspidata (Warb.) Domin; Ficus oblongata Link; Ficus pedunculata Aiton; Ficus pedunculata var. acuta Nutt.; Ficus populifolia Desf.; Ficus populnea Willd.; Ficus populnea var. bahamensis Warb.; Ficus populnea f. botryapioides (Kunth & C.D.Bouché) Warb.; Ficus populnea var. brevifolia (Nutt.) Warb.; Ficus populnea var. hispaniolae (Warb.) Urb.; Ficus populnea var. laevigata (Vahl) Warb.; Ficus populnea var. lentiginosa Warb.; Ficus populoides Warb.; Ficus populoides var. dilatata Warb.; Ficus populoides var. elongata Warb.; Ficus populoides var. maculosa Warb.; Ficus populoides f. syringifolia Warb.; Ficus populoides f. umbrifera Warb.; Ficus portoricensis Urb.; Ficus pyrifolia Desf. 1829 not Burm. f. 1768; Ficus rectinervis Warb.; Ficus rubrinervis Link; Ficus sancti-crucis (Liebm.) Miq.; Ficus syringifolia Kunth & C.D.Bouché; Ficus thomaea Miq.; Ficus turbinata Pittier 1937 not Willd. 1806; Oluntos laevigata (Vahl) Raf.; Urostigma botryapioides (Kunth & C.D. Bouché) Miq.; Urostigma giganteum (Kunth) Miq.; Urostigma laevigatum (Vahl) Miq.; Urostigma lentiginosum (Vahl) Liebm.; Urostigma pedunculatum (Aiton) Miq.; Urostigma populneum (Willd.) Miq.; Urostigma sancti-crucis Liebm.; Urostigma syringifolium (Kunth & C.D.Bouché) Miq.

= Ficus citrifolia =

Shortleaf fig

Species of fig native to the Americas

Ficus citrifolia, also known as the shortleaf fig, giant bearded fig, Jagüey, wild banyantree and Wimba tree, is a species of banyan native to southern Florida, the Caribbean, Mexico, Central America, and northern South America south to Paraguay. It is distinguished from the closely related Florida strangler fig (Ficus aurea) mainly by the finer veining in the leaves.

== Description ==
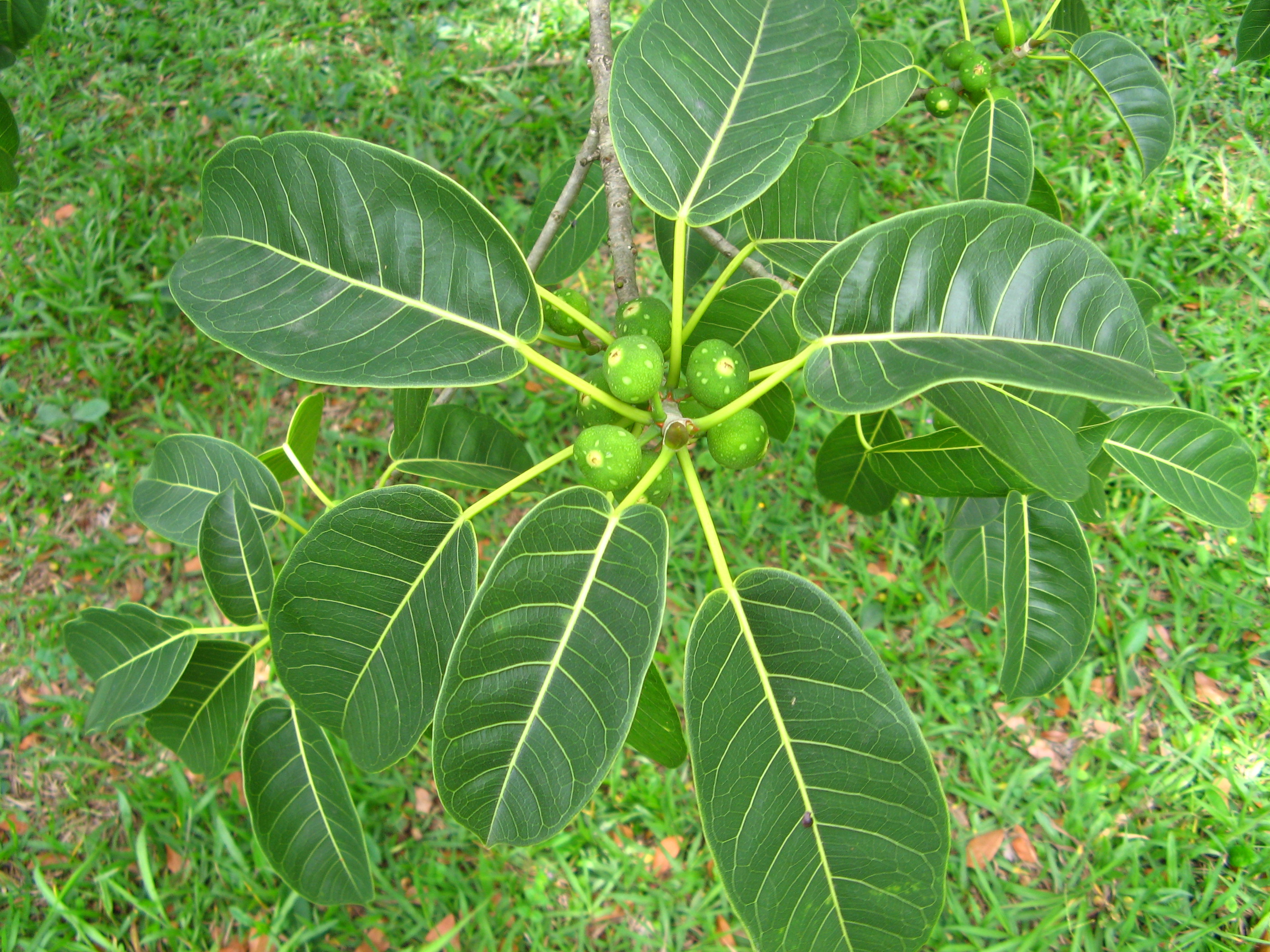
Leaves and seeds, São Paulo, Brazil

Ficus citrifolia trees typically grow 15 m (50 ft) tall, and may cover a wide area due to their ability to drop aerial roots from branches and spread horizontally, fusing with the parent tree as they grow. They have a broad top, light grey bark, some aerial roots and milky sap. The leaves of F. citrifolia are dark green. They are oval shaped with a rounded base and pointed tip. Small flowers are enclosed in open ended fruit. The fruit appears on the ends of long stalks protruding from the leaf axils. Fruit turn from yellow to dark-red when ripe. This fruit is sweet and can be eaten raw.

== Ecology ==
New trees begin their life as an epiphyte, a strategy which allows them to avoid competition for light and land. F. citrifolia commonly attacks palms, bald cypress, oaks and other trees, strangling them as it grows.

Ficus citrifolia is under strong selective pressure to flower and produce fruit year round due to its mutualistic relationship with its pollinating agaonid wasp. Agaonid wasps have a symbiotic relationship with figs such that a given agaonid species acts as a pollinator for just one species of fig, and a particular fig species is pollinated by just one species of wasp. F. citrifolia is pollinated by P. assuetus. After pollination, figs ripen quickly. The growth rate of figs is slower during the cold dry months in comparison to hot and rainy months were fruit growth is concentrated. Fruit bearing figs are heavily laden; a single tree may produce up to 1,000,000 fruits with a diameter of 1–2.5 cm. The fruit of F. citrifolia tends to have a purgative effect on the digestive systems of many animals; ripe fruits are eaten and seeds are spread widely through dung.

The invertebrates within F. citrifolia syconia in southern Florida include a pollinating wasp, P. assuetus, up to eight or more species of non-pollinating wasps, a plant-parasitic nematode transported by the pollinator, a parasitic nematode attacking the pollinating wasp, mites, a midge, and a predatory rove beetle whose adults and larvae eat fig wasps. Nematodes: Schistonchus laevigatus (Aphelenchoididae) is a plant-parasitic nematode associated with the pollinator Pegoscapus assuetus and syconia of F. citrifolia. Parasitodiplogaster laevigata is a parasite of the pollinator Pegoscapus assuetus. Mites: belonging to the family Tarsonemidae (Acarina) have been recognized in the syconia of F. aurea and F. citrifolia, but they have not been identified even to genus, and their behavior is undescribed. Midges: Ficiomyia perarticulata (Cecidomyiidae) oviposits in the walls of syconia of F. citrifolia, and the developing larvae induce the plant to form galls there. Rove beetles: Charoxus spinifer is a rove beetle (Coleoptera: Staphylinidae) whose adults enter late-stage syconia of F. aurea and F. citrifolia. Adults eat fig wasps; larvae develop within the syconia and prey on fig wasps, then pupate in the ground.

== Keystone species ==
Ficus citrifolia is considered a tropical keystone species. Figs are a major component of the diets of more species of animals than any other tropical perennial fruit. Since F. citrifolia fruits year round many primates, birds and other species, feed exclusively on figs during seasons when other fruit is scarce. Additionally, the knobby, hollow, lattice-like trunk of this tree provides a home for thousands of invertebrates, rodents, bats, birds and reptiles.

F. citrifolia is considered common and is not in danger of extinction.

== Genetic mosaics ==
F. citrifolia may fuse with figs of other species types, creating a cumulate tree that is a genetic mosaic. Research suggests that the frequency of genetic mosaicism among strangler figs may be quite high; it is unknown how this variation effects flowering in mosaic figs. (Thomson et al., 1995). Thomson et al. suggest that if genetically different segments of a single tree flower asynchronously, agaonid wasp populations may be more resistant to low host population sizes that previously thought. Alternatively, genetic mosaicism could mean that the number of certain varieties of fig in an ecosystem may be far lower than biologists have previously thought, and given populations may not have enough trees to maintain their symbiotic relationship with their pollinating wasps.

== History ==
One theory is that the Portuguese name for F. citrifolia, "Os Barbados", gave Barbados its name. It appears on the coat of arms of Barbados, and the removal of one specimen, over 100 years old, was enough to draw attention.

== Medicine ==
An extract of F. citrifolia may have therapeutic value for chemotherapy patients.
