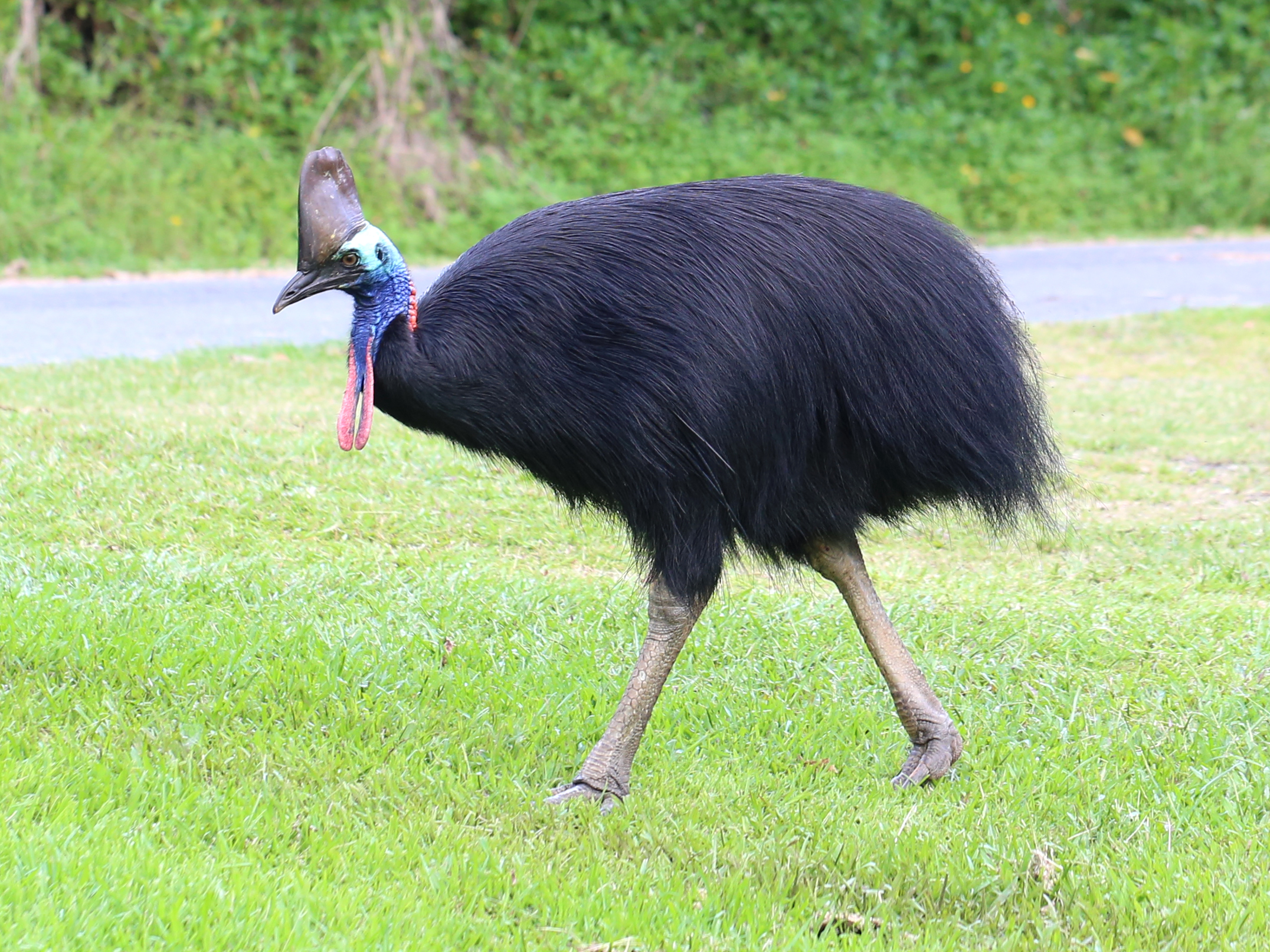
- Wild individual seen in Etty Bay, Queensland, Australia

Conservation status
- Least Concern (IUCN 3.1)

- Endangered (EPBC Act)

Scientific classification
- Kingdom: Animalia
- Phylum: Chordata
- Class: Aves
- Infraclass: Palaeognathae
- Order: Casuariiformes
- Family: Casuariidae
- Genus: Casuarius
- Species: C. casuarius

Binomial name
- Casuarius casuarius (Linnaeus, 1758)
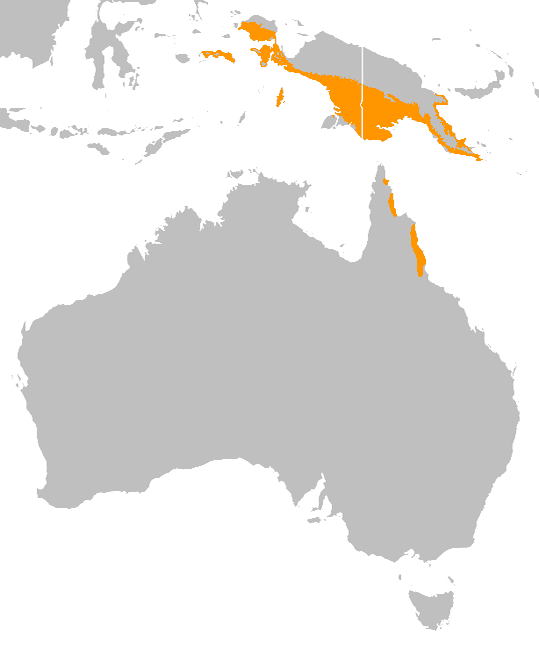
- Native distribution of the southern cassowary

Synonyms
- List: Struthio casuarius Linnaeus 1758; Casuarius casuarius altijugus Sclater 1878; Casuarius altijugus Sclater 1878; Casuarius casuarius aruensis Schlegel 1866; Casuarius aruensis Schlegel 1866; Casuarius australis Wall 1854; Casuarius casuarius beccarii Sclater 1875; Casuarius beccarii Sclater 1875; Casuarius bicarunculatus Sclater 1860; Casuarius casuarius bicarunculatus Sclater 1860; Casuarius bistriatus van Oort 1907; Casuarius casuarius bistriatus van Oort 1907; Casuarius casuarius casuarius Linnaeus 1758; Casuarius casuarius chimaera Rothschild 1904; Cassowara eximia Perry 1811; Casuarius casuarius grandis Rothschild 1937; Casuarius galeatus Bonnaterre 1790; Casuarius casuarius hamiltoni Mathews 1915; Casuarius casuarius intensus Rothschild 1898; Casuarius bicarunculatus intermedius Rothschild 1928; Casuarius casuarius intermedius Rothschild 1928; Casuarius casuarius johnsonii Müller 1866; Casuarius johnsonii Müller 1866; Casuarius casuarius lateralis Rothschild 1925; Casuarius casuarius salvadorii Oustalet 1878; Casuarius salvadorii Oustalet 1878; Casuarius casuarius sclaterii Salvadori 1878; Casuarius sclaterii Salvadori 1878; Casuarius casuarius tricarunculatus Beccari 1876; Casuarius bicarunculatus tricarunculatus Beccari 1876; Casuarius tricarunculatus Beccari 1876; Casuarius casuarius violicollis Rothschild 1899; Hippalectryo indicus Gloger 1842; Casuarius hagenbecki Rothschild 1904

= Southern cassowary =

Species of flightless bird

The southern cassowary (Casuarius casuarius), also known as double-wattled cassowary, Australian cassowary, or two-wattled cassowary, is a large, flightless, mostly black bird, found in Indonesia, Papua New Guinea, and northeastern Australia. It is one of the three living species of cassowary, alongside the dwarf cassowary and the northern cassowary. It is a ratite and therefore related to the emu, ostrich, rhea and kiwi. Southern cassowaries are among the largest birds in the world, only weighing less than ostriches.

The Australian population is listed as Endangered under federal and Queensland state legislation.

== Taxonomy ==
Presently, most authorities consider the southern cassowary monotypic, but several subspecies have been described. It has proven very difficult to confirm the validity of these due to individual variations, age-related variations, the relatively few available specimens (and the fact that the bright skin of the head and neck – the basis upon which several subspecies have been described – fades in specimens), and that locals are known to have traded live cassowaries for hundreds, if not thousands of years, some of which are likely to have escaped/been deliberately introduced to regions away from their origin.

Cassowaries are the sister lineage of emus, both being in the family casuariidae.

The binomial name Casuarius casuarius is derived from its Malay name kesuari. The southern cassowary was first described by Carl Linnaeus, in his 18th-century work Systema Naturae, as Struthio casuarius, from a specimen from Seram, in 1758. It is now the type species of the genus Casuarius. Common names for the species include southern cassowary, double-wattled cassowary, Australian cassowary, and two-wattled cassowary.

The southern cassowary has been described under a large number of scientific names, all of which are now considered taxonomic synonyms for the species.

== Description ==
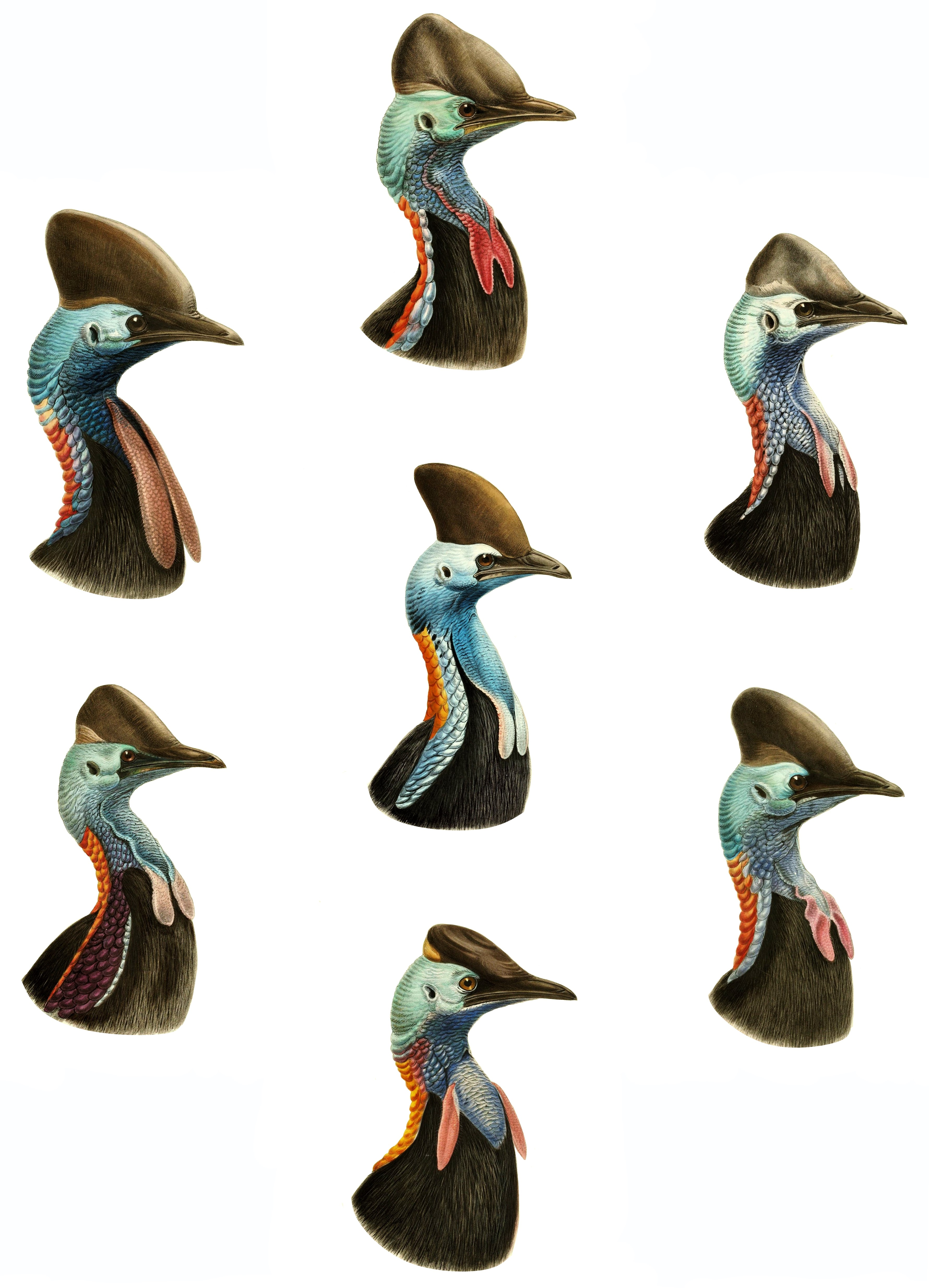
Phenotypic diversity of the head

The adult southern cassowary has stiff, bristly black plumage, a blue face and a long neck, red on the cape and two red wattles measuring up to 18 cm (7.1 in) in length hanging down around its throat. A horn-like brown casque, measuring 13 to 20 cm (5.1 to 7.9 in) high, sits atop the head. The bill can range from 9.8 to 19 cm (3.9 to 7.5 in). The plumage is sexually monomorphic, but the female is dominant and larger with a longer casque, larger bill and brighter-coloured bare parts. Plumage of the southern cassowary develops as it grows, juveniles with soft, fuzzy and striped plumage for the first few months. Immature birds are covered in hair-like brown plumage, and as they grow, the feathers darken.

The three-toed feet are thick and powerful, equipped with a dagger-like claw up to 12 cm (4.7 in) on the inner toe. Southern cassowaries are among the largest living birds, only being lighter on average than ostriches, the largest contemporary individuals have been recorded around 85 kg (187 lb) and 2 m (6 ft 6 1/2 in) tall. Typically, the bird stands 1.5–1.8 m (4.9–5.9 ft) in height. Male southern cassowaries are lighter than the females, weighing between 29.2–55 kg (64–121 lb). Adult female birds can weigh from 46.7 kg (103 lb) to 76 kg (168 lb).

With powerful legs, the southern cassowary can run at speeds of up to 50 km/h (31 mph) and jump nearly 2 m (6.6 ft) vertically. They are strong swimmers capable of moving across rivers and streams.

In 2026, scientists discovered that southern cassowary casques glow under ultraviolet light, and in different patterns than northern cassowary casques.

=== Historical claims and observations ===
From 1870 to 1894, Archibald Meston, Robert Johnstone, and others had shot, weighed, and documented southern cassowaries in Queensland that far exceeded typical mass. These specimens ranged in mass from 168–263 lb (76–119 kg). In 1889, Meston claimed the specimen shot by John Nairne was weighed at 263 lb (119 kg), saying it was "probably the largest ever killed." He later cited the figure as 280 lb (130 kg) and 250 lb (110 kg), Meston had written, "there is no reason to suppose that was the largest living specimen" when referring to this individual bird.

Reportedly, there have been observations of southern cassowaries jumping nearly to over 8 ft (2.4 m) over a fence in a single bound.

Archibald Meston claimed to have seen and reported a sighting of a white cassowary which he thought to be albino on Mulgrave River in Queensland, in 1885. He described the bird as lacking wattles or the typical bright colors on its neck.

== Range and habitat ==
The southern cassowary is distributed in Indonesia, Papua New Guinea, and northeastern Australia. It mainly inhabits tropical rainforests but may make use of nearby savannah forests or mangroves stands. The species prefers elevations below 1,100 m (3,600 ft) in Australia, and 500 m (1,600 ft) in New Guinea.

As of 2018, according to Birdlife International, the breeding populations were as follows:

Breeding population and trends
Location	Population	Trend
Southern New Guinea	Unknown	Declining
Seram, Indonesia	Unknown	Unknown
Aru Islands, Indonesia	Unknown	Unknown
Northeastern Australia	1,500 to 2,500	Declining
Paluma Range, Qld, Australia	Unknown	Declining
McIlwraith Range, Qld, Australia	1,000+	Declining
Apudthama National Park, Qld, Australia	Unknown	Unknown
Total	4,000+	Declining

== Diet ==
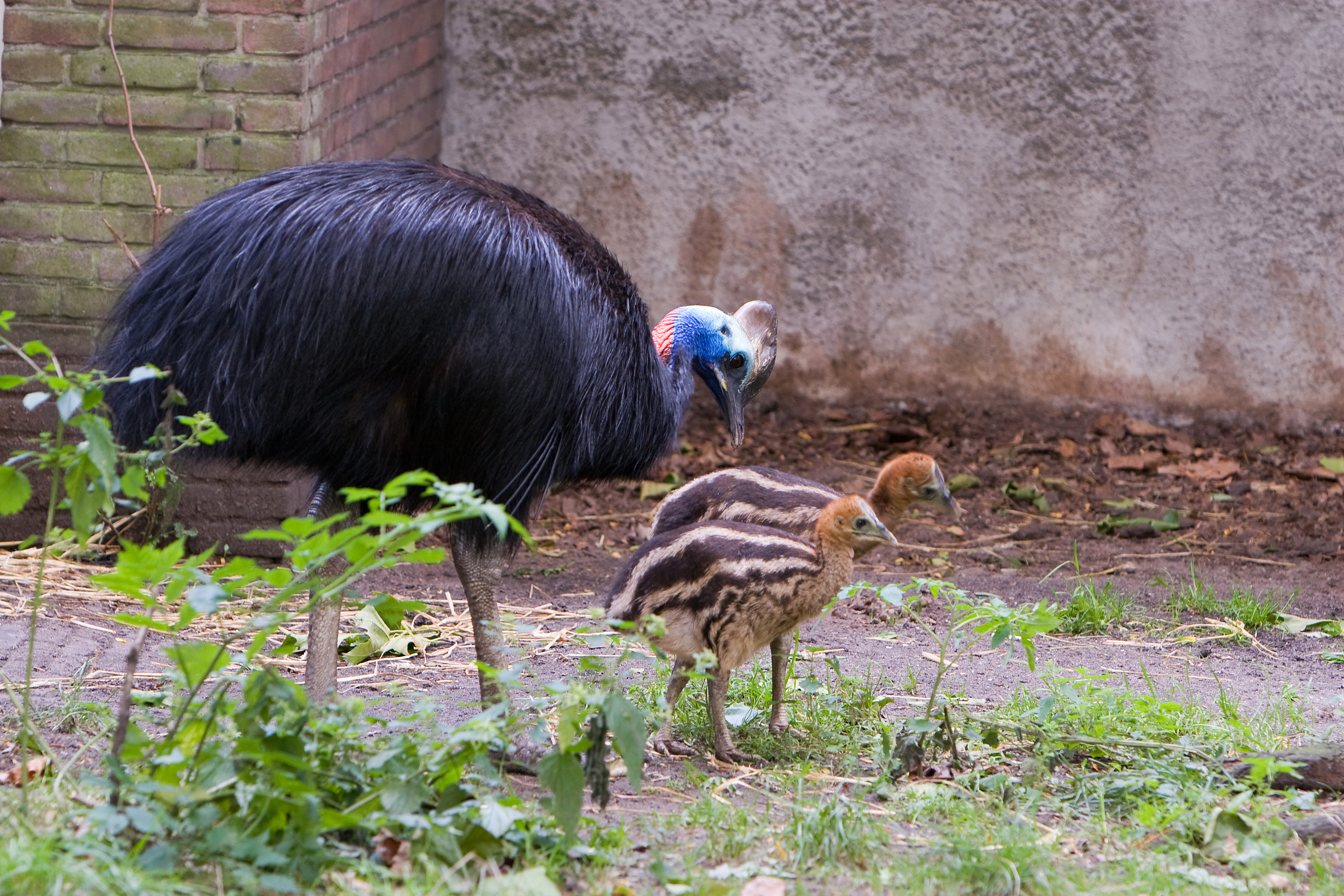
Adult male with two chicks

Southern cassowaries forage on the forest floor for fallen fruit and seeds and are capable of safely digesting some fruits and seeds toxic to other animals. They also eat fungi, and some insects, other invertebrates (such as snails), small vertebrates (such as fish, frogs, small birds and their eggs and nestlings, and small mammals), and carrion. When food is scarce, both wild and captive cassowaries have been seen to ingest earth, perhaps seeking supplementary minerals. Inspection of the faeces reveals that commonly ingested fruits are Davidsonia pruriens, Syzygium divaricatum, and members of the palm (Arecaceae), quandong (Elaeocarpaceae), laurel (Lauraceae), and myrtle (Myrtaceae) families.

== Behavior ==
Southern cassowaries make a thunderous call during mating season, and hissing and rumblings otherwise. Chicks will make frequent high-pitched contact whistles and chirps to call the male.

=== Breeding ===
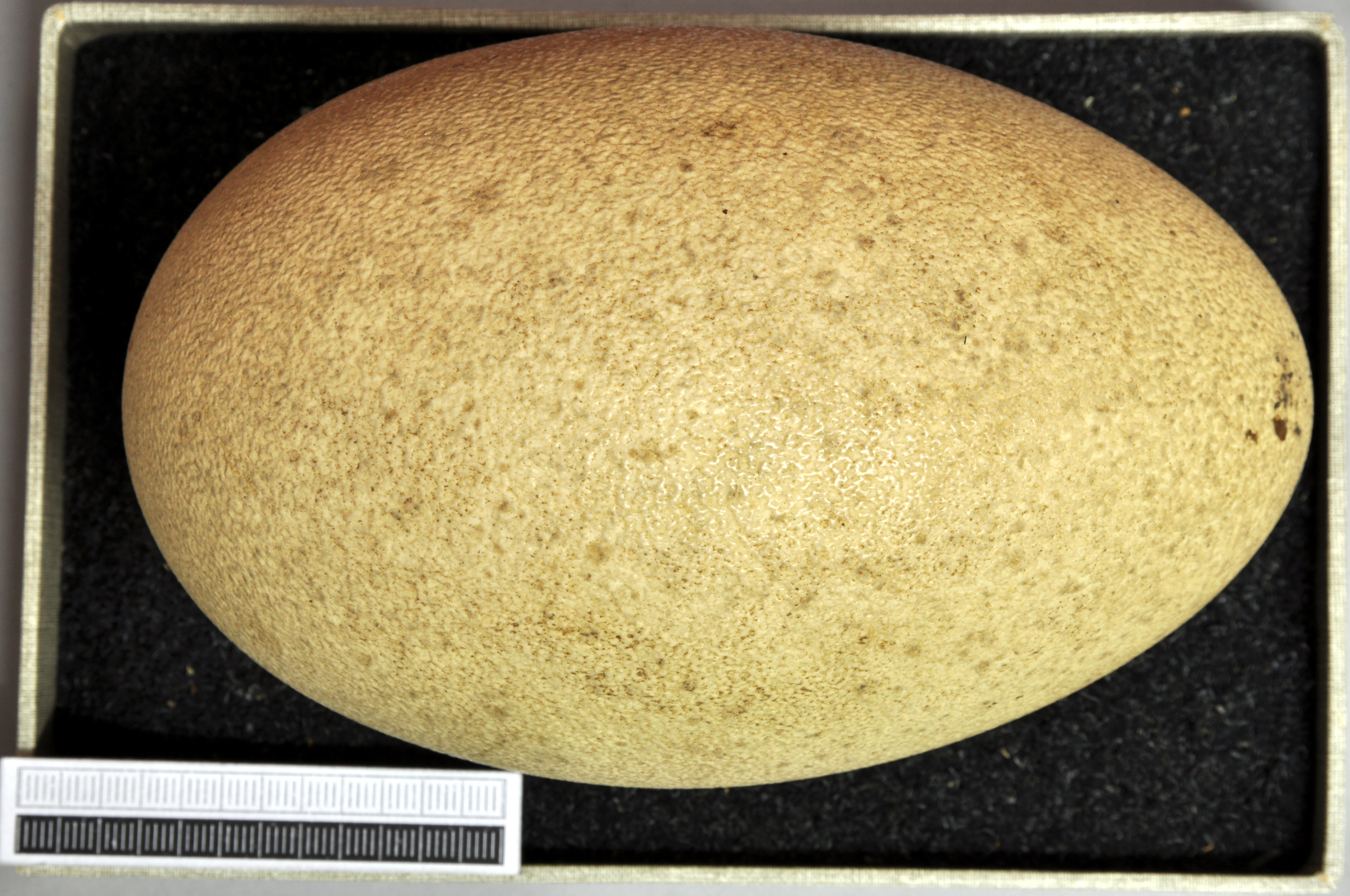
Egg at Museum Wiesbaden

The southern cassowary is a solitary bird, which pairs only in breeding season, in late winter or spring (but highly variable). The male builds a nest on the ground, a mattress of herbaceous plant material 5 to 10 centimetres (2–4 in) thick and up to 100 centimetres (39 in) wide. This is thick enough to let moisture drain away from the eggs. The male also incubates the eggs and raises the chicks alone. A clutch of three to five eggs are laid measuring 11.8–15.8 cm (4.6–6.2 in) in length and 8.2–10.2 cm (3.2–4.0 in) in width, with a mass of around 567–634 g (1.250–1.398 lb). They have a granulated surface and are initially bright pea-green in colour although they fade with age. The incubation period takes around 50 days.

Chicks hatch precocial, fully feathered, and able to move and explore within hours of hatching. Parental care is done solely by the male, who the chicks depend on for survival. Young birds typically become independent at 9–12 months of age. It will take around 4–5 years for the casque and adult plumage to fully develop, this is also the time in which successful breeding usually starts.

== Interaction with humans ==
Full-grown southern cassowary compared to an adult man

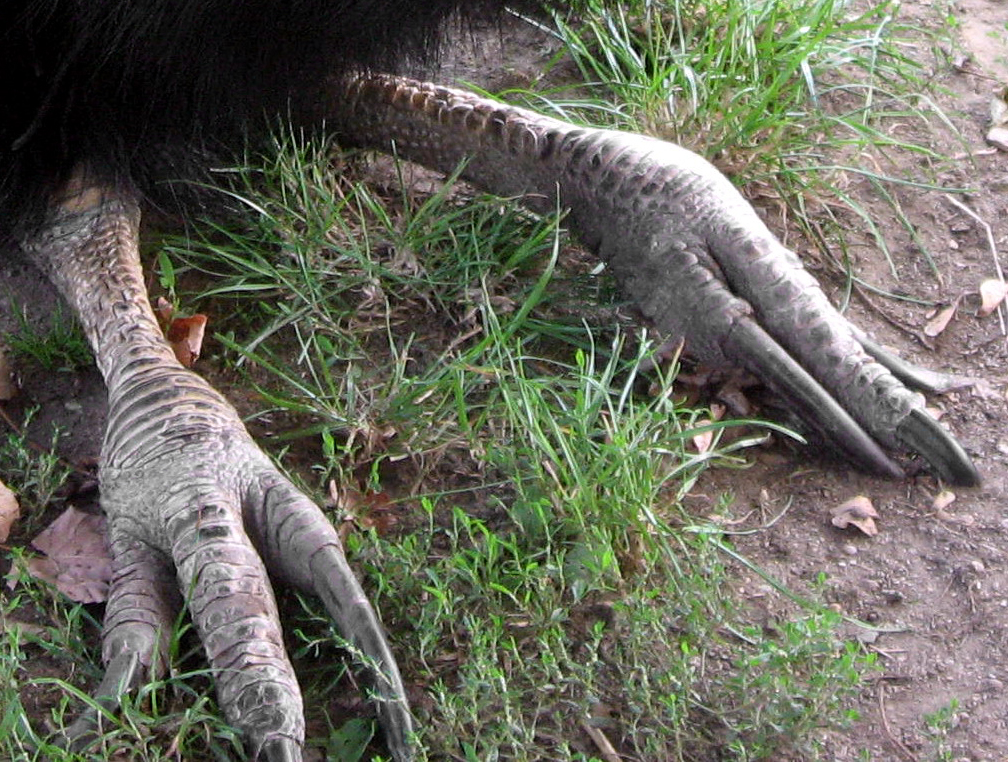
Detail of feet showing spearlike inner claw

Southern cassowaries have a reputation for being dangerous to humans and other animals, and are often regarded as aggressive. The birds can jump quite high and kick powerfully with their blade-like claws. However, deadly encounters with southern cassowaries are rare. Only two human deaths have been reported since 1900. A 2003 historical study of 221 southern cassowary attacks showed that 150 had been against humans: 75% of these had been from southern cassowaries that had been fed by people, 71% of the time the bird had chased or charged the victim, 15% of the time they kicked. Of the attacks, 73% involved the birds expecting or snatching food, 5% involved defending their natural food sources, 15% involved defending themselves from attack, and 7% involved defending their chicks or eggs. Only one human death was reported among those 150 attacks.

The first documented human death caused by a southern cassowary was on 6 April 1926. In Australia, 16-year-old Phillip McClean and his brother, age 13, came across a southern cassowary on their property and decided to try to kill it by striking it with clubs. The bird kicked the younger boy, who fell and ran away as his older brother struck the bird. The older McClean then tripped and fell to the ground. While he was on the ground, the cassowary kicked him in the neck, opening a 1.25 cm (0.5 in) wound that may have severed his jugular vein. The boy died of his injuries shortly thereafter.

Another human death due to a southern cassowary was recorded in Florida, United States on 12 April 2019. The bird's owner, a 75-year-old man who had raised the animal, was apparently clawed to death after he fell to the ground.

Feeding by humans can draw cassowaries to human-inhabited areas, increasing the risk of vehicle strikes, a major cause of southern cassowary mortality, and increasing the likelihood of encounters with humans.

In a 2017 Australian Birdlife article, Karl Brandt suggested Aboriginal encounters with the southern cassowary may have inspired the myth of the bunyip.

== Conservation ==
Although subject to ongoing habitat loss (some due to logging), limited range, and overhunting in some areas, the southern cassowary was evaluated as Least concern in 2018 by the International Union for Conservation of Nature (IUCN). Other threats include feral animals eating their eggs and roadkill. Road-building, feral animals and hunting are the worst of these threats. It has an occurrence range of 396,000 km^{2} (153,000 sq mi), and between 10,000 and 20,000 birds were estimated in a 2002 study, with between 1,500 and 2,500 in Australia.

The Queensland (Australia) Department of Transport and Main Roads trialed a system using AI to detect the presence of these birds near a roadway coupled with warning signs. This may have resulted in reduction in fatal accidents of as much as a third, though the data may have been confounded by a speed limit reduction around the same time.

The Australian population is listed as Endangered under federal (EPBC Act). Under the Nature Conservation (Animals) Regulation 2020 (Queensland), November 2022 list, the northern population is considered vulnerable, while the southern population remains as endangered. A draft recovery plan to save the species was published by the federal government in June 2023, at which time there were estimated to be around 5,000 individuals in Australia. A study published in Biological Conservation in March 2023 listed 23 species which the authors considered to no longer meet the criteria as threatened species under the EPBC Act, including the Southern cassowary. A 2021 study had shown that extensive reservation had led to recovery of the species, and legislation had prevented the previously rapid loss of habitat. The reason for their assessment was given as "Populations now stable or declining at a rate less than threshold". The team, led by John Woinarski of Charles Darwin University looked at all species listed as threatened under the act in 2000 and 2022.

Southern cassowaries have been bred in zoos around the world, including White Oak Conservation in Yulee, Florida, United States.

== Gallery ==
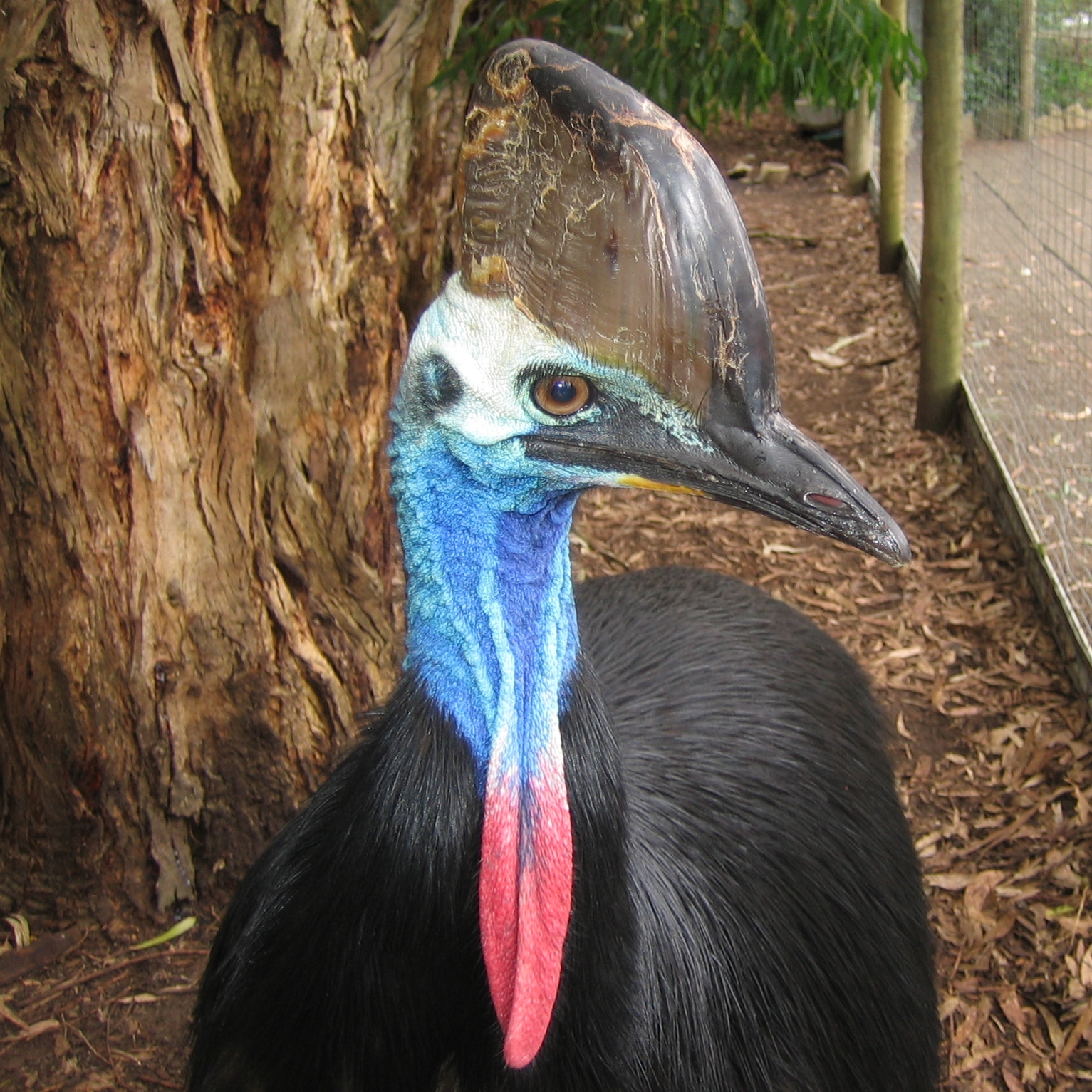
Upper body

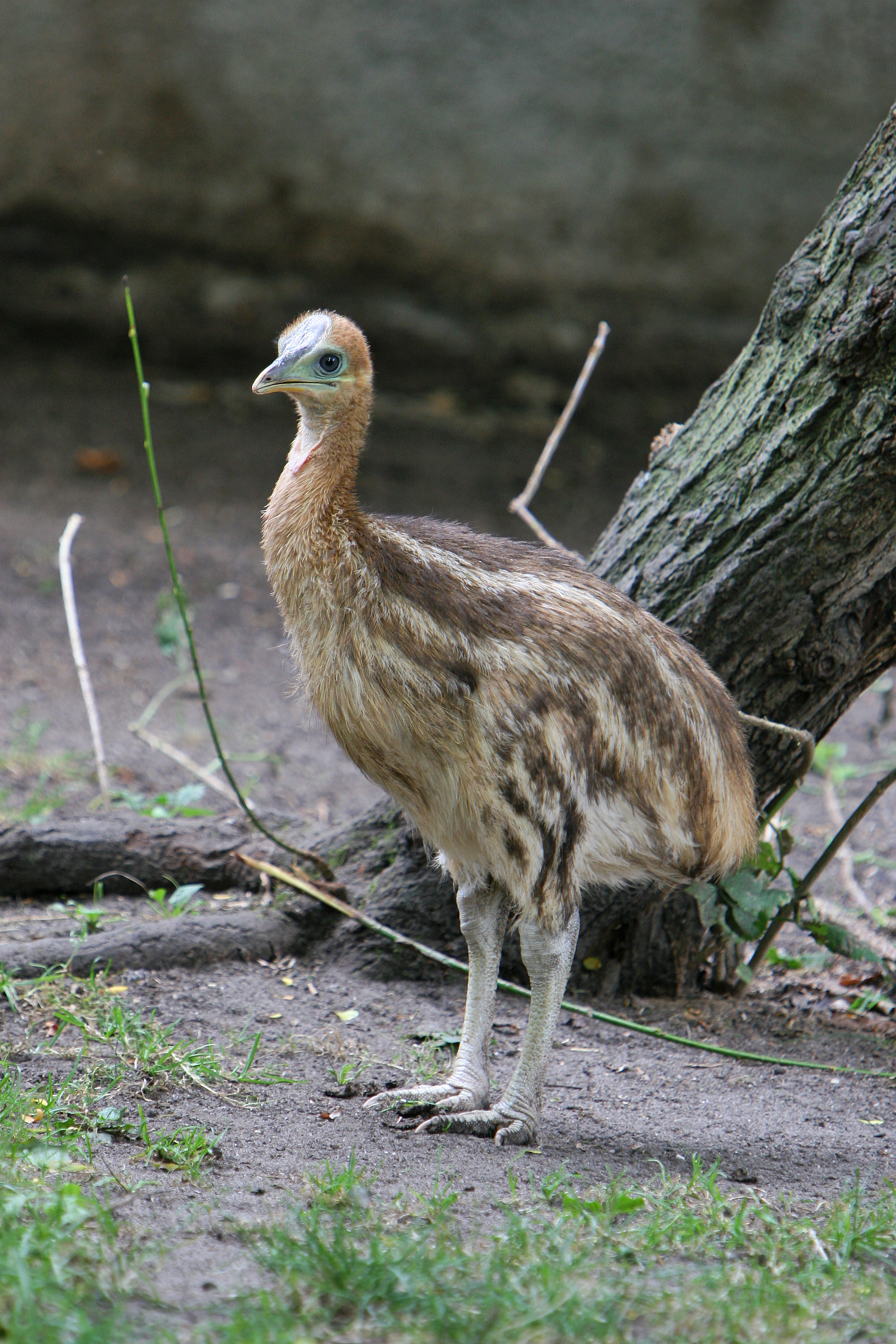
Chick at Artis Zoo, Netherlands

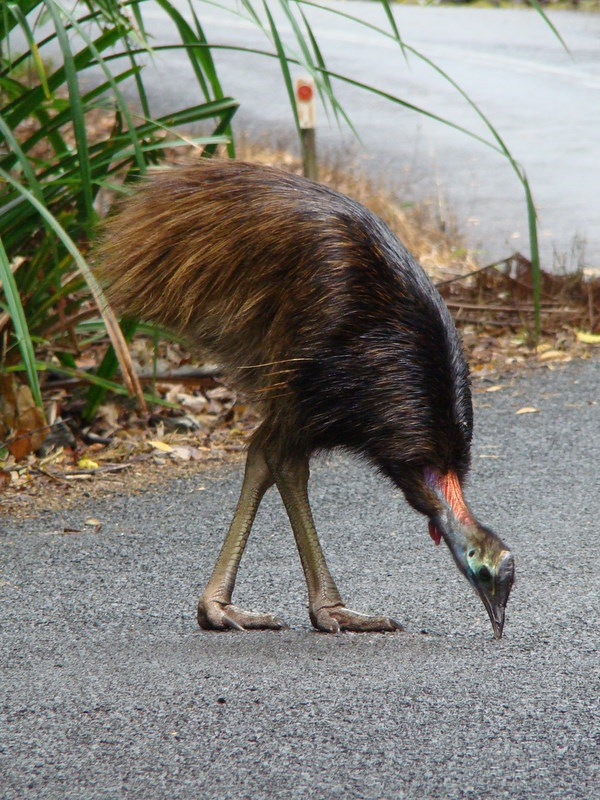
An older juvenile walking across a road in Australia

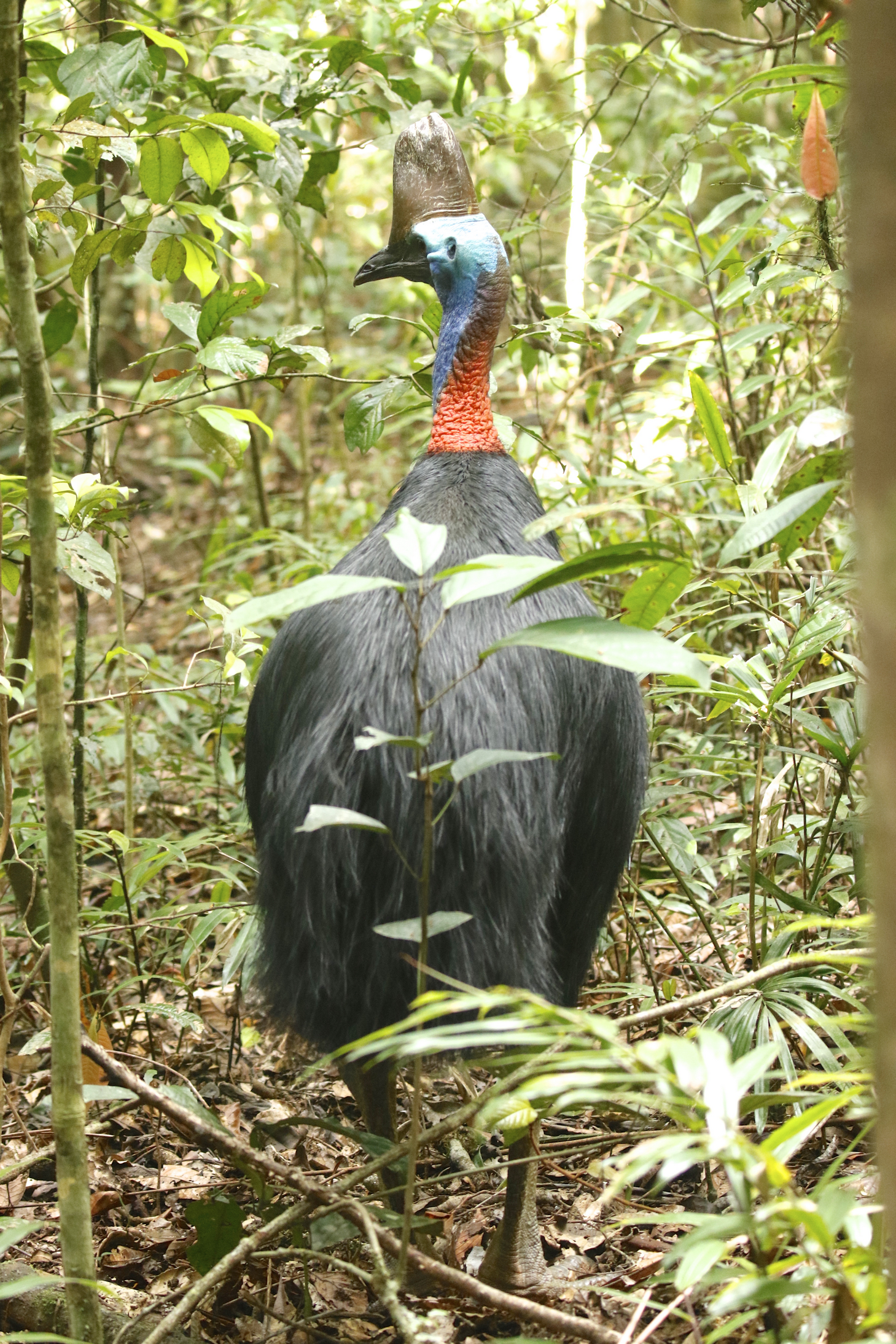
Mount Hypipamee National Park, Australia

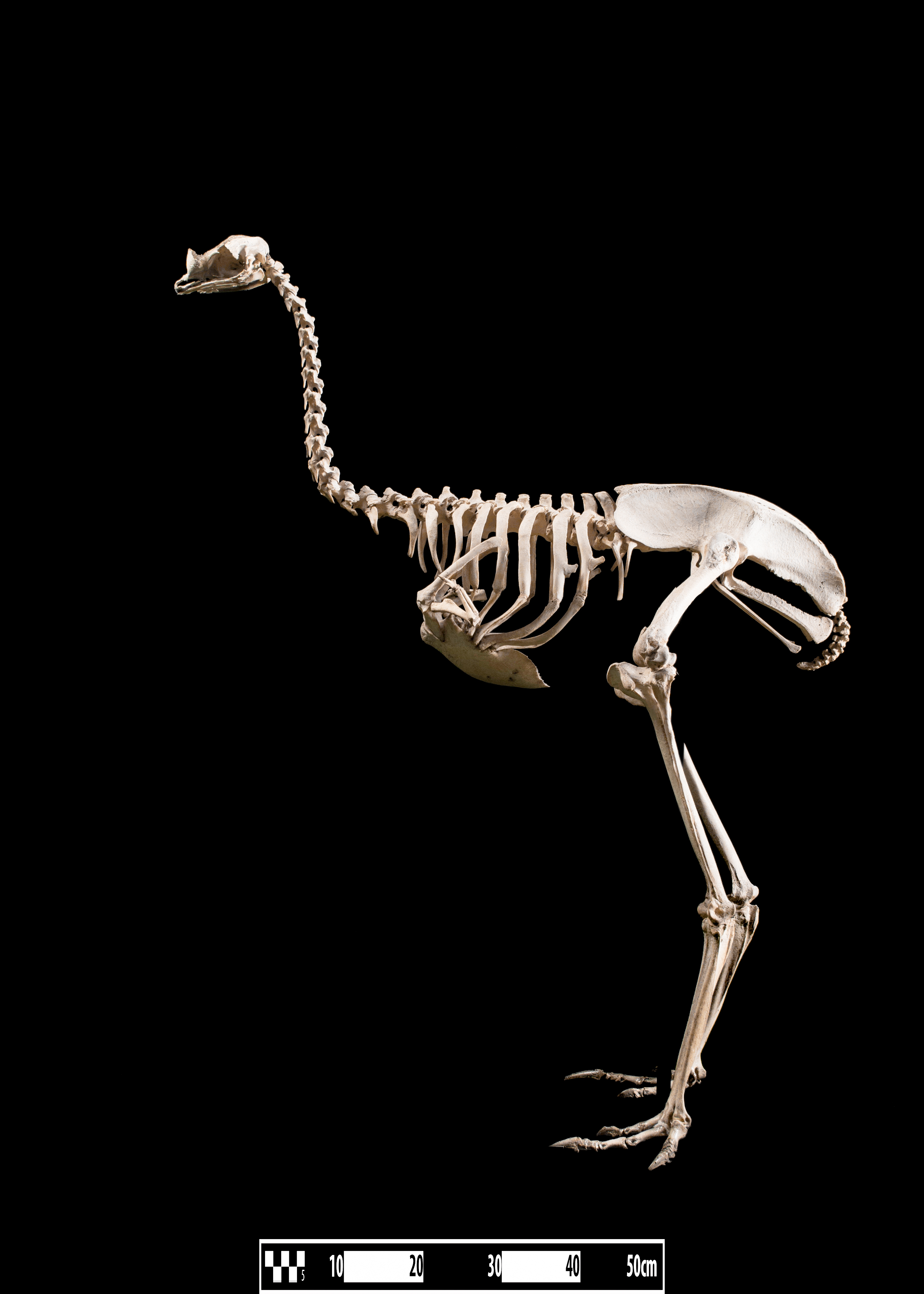
Skeletal mount (note damaged skull)
