= Syzygium divaricatum =

Scientific classification
- Kingdom: Plantae
- Clade: Tracheophytes
- Clade: Angiosperms
- Clade: Eudicots
- Clade: Rosids
- Order: Myrtales
- Family: Myrtaceae
- Genus: Syzygium
- Species: S. divaricatum

Binomial name
- Syzygium divaricatum (Merr. & L.M.Perry) Craven & Biffin, 2006

Synonyms
- Acmena divaricata Merr. & L.M.Perry, 1938

Species of flowering plant

Syzygium divaricatum, known commonly as the cassowary gum or cassowary satinash, is a species of flowering plant in the family Myrtaceae that is endemic to Queensland in Australia.

== Habitat & distribution ==
The species is endemic to tropical lowland and montane rainforest in the Wet Tropics of North Queensland.

== Description ==
This species grows as a tree to a height of 30 metres. The species has a perennial life cycle and is hermaphroditic. The flowering time of this species is from November to January and the fruiting time is from January to November. The fruit is fleshy, indehiscent and baccate. Seeds of this species are dispersed by cassowaries. The leaves are 210 millimetres long and 85 millimetres wide. The species is evergreen.
