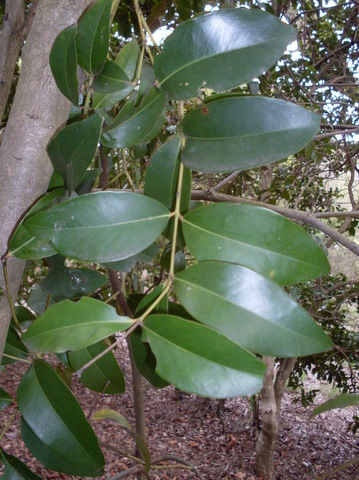

Conservation status
- Least Concern (IUCN 3.1)

Scientific classification
- Kingdom: Plantae
- Clade: Tracheophytes
- Clade: Angiosperms
- Clade: Eudicots
- Clade: Rosids
- Order: Myrtales
- Family: Myrtaceae
- Genus: Syzygium
- Species: S. hemilamprum

Binomial name
- Syzygium hemilamprum (F.Muell.) Craven & Biffin

Subspecies
- Syzygium hemilamprum subsp. hemilamprum; Syzygium hemilamprum subsp. orophilum (B.Hyland) Craven & Biffin

Synonyms
- Acmena hemilampra (F.Muell.) Merr. & L.M.Perry nom. alt.; Eugenia hemilampra F.Muell. nom. alt.; synonyms of subsp. hemilamprum: Eugenia smithii var. hemilampra F.Muell.; Syzygium acmenoides Merr. & L.M.Perry; synonyms of subsp. orophilum: Acmena hemilampra subsp. orophila B.Hyland

= Syzygium hemilamprum =

Broad-leaved lilly pilly

Species of tree

Syzygium hemilamprum, commonly known as the broad-leaved lilly pilly, blush satinash, cassowary gum, Eungella gum, and treated as Acmena hemilampra in New South Wales and Queensland, is a species of flowering plant in the family Myrtaceae and is native to New Guinea, New South Wales, Queensland, and the Northern Territory. It is a rainforest tree with broadly lance-shaped to elliptic leaves, panicles of white flowers and more or less spherical white fruit.

== Description ==
Syzygium hemilamprum is a tree that typically grows to a height of 35 m (115 ft) with a diameter at breast height of up to 120 cm (47 in). The trunk is flanged or buttressed in larger trees, and has fissured and flaky reddish-brown bark. The leaves are arranged in opposite pairs, broadly lance-shaped to elliptic, 39–131 mm (1.5–5.2 in) long and 18–60 mm (0.71–2.36 in) wide on a petiole 2–10 mm (0.079–0.394 in) long. The leaves are glossy and more or less glabrous on the upper surface and paler below. The flowers are arranged in panicles on the ends of branchlets, each flower on a pedicel 2.5–5 mm (0.098–0.197 in) long. The sepals are joined at the base forming a tube about 1.5–4 mm (0.059–0.157 in) in diameter, the sepal lobes small and inconspicuous. The petals are more or less circular, 1–1.5 mm (0.039–0.059 in) long and the stamens 0.5–2.5 mm (0.020–0.098 in) long. Flowering occurs from October to November and the fruit is white and more less spherical, 11–17 mm (0.43–0.67 in) in diameter.

== Taxonomy ==
This lilly pilly was first formally described in 1875 by Ferdinand von Mueller and given the name Eugenia hemilampra in Flora Australiensis. In the same publication, von Mueller also gave it the alternative name Eugenia smithii var. hemilampra and both names are validly published.

In 1938, Elmer Drew Merrill and Lily May Perry changed the name E. hemilampra to Acmena hemilampra in the Journal of the Arnold Arboretum, and the name Acmena hemilampra Merr. & L.M.Perry is the name used by the National Herbarium of New South Wales. Then in 2006, Lyndley Craven and Edward Sturt Biffin changed von Mueller's E. hemilampra to Syzygium hemilamprum in the journal Blumea. The name Syzygium hemilamprum is accepted by the Australian Plant Census.

== Distribution and habitat ==
Often seen on sand by the sea in littoral rainforests, it reaches its best development in the red/brown volcanic soils, such as around the Mount Warning caldera. The natural range of distribution is from Yamba to Cape York Peninsula in the far north eastern tip of Australia.

Removal of the flesh from the seed is advised to assist seed germination. Germination is slow, taking up to 80 days. However, cuttings strike well.
