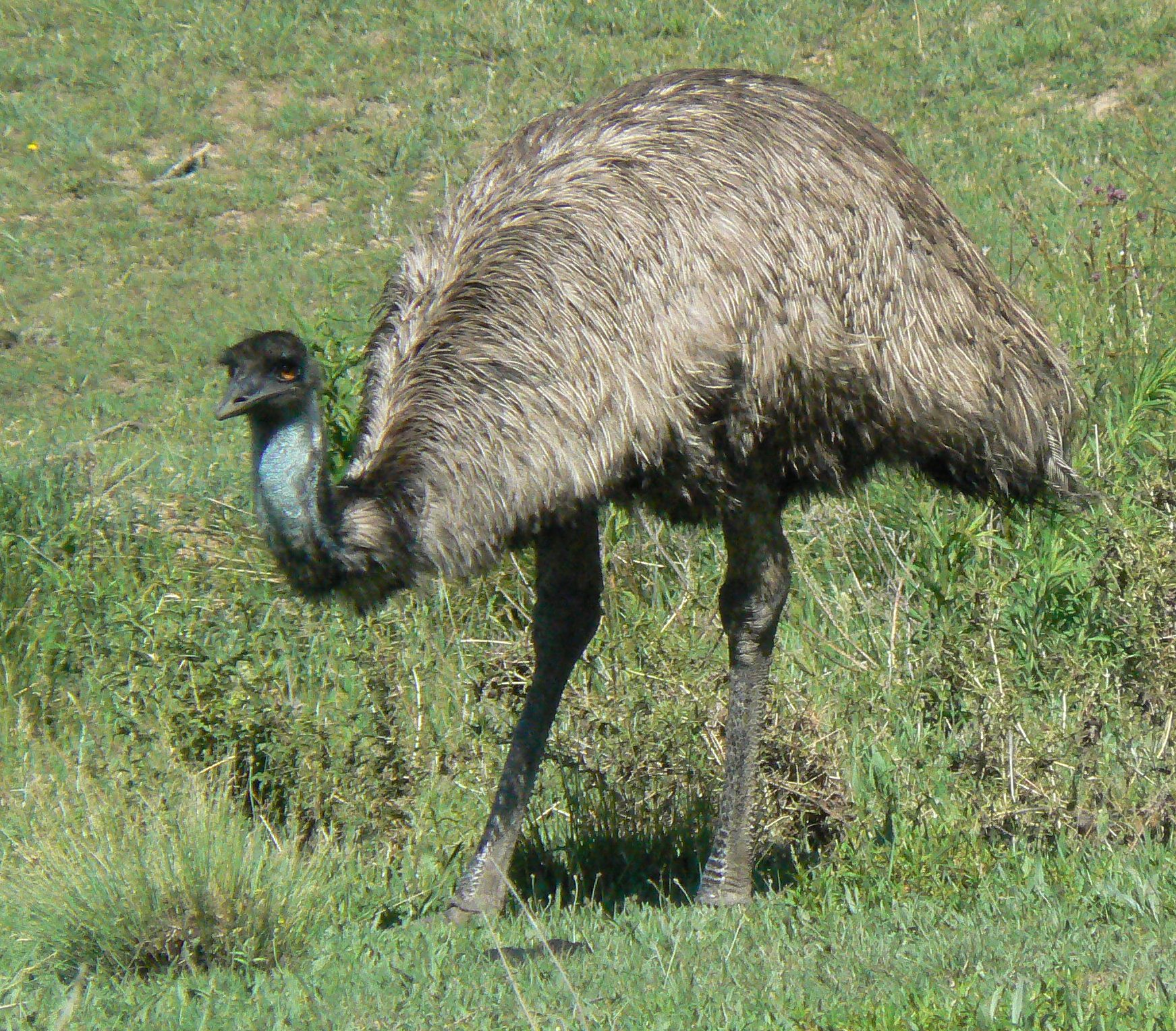
- An individual at Pierces Creek, Canberra, New South Wales

Scientific classification
- Kingdom: Animalia
- Phylum: Chordata
- Class: Aves
- Infraclass: Palaeognathae
- Order: Casuariiformes
- Family: Casuariidae
- Genus: Dromaius
- Species: D. novaehollandiae
- Subspecies: D. n. rothschildi

Trinomial name
- Dromaius novaehollandiae rothschildi Mathews, 1912

= Rothschild's emu =

Rothschild’s emu

Subspecies of bird

Rothschild's emu (Dromaius novaehollandiae rothschildi) is a subspecies of the emu that is native to parts of southern Australia, primarily within the states of Western Australia, South Australia, Victoria, and New South Wales, although it may have occasionally wandered into other nearby states. It has a darker feather coat, with no ruff apparent during its breeding season, which is a contrast between it and the main emu subspecies, Dromaius novaehollandiae novaehollandiae. A disputed mixed divide is present on its taxonomic status, for some zoologists believe it is not an official subspecies, and some believe it is its own subspecies.
