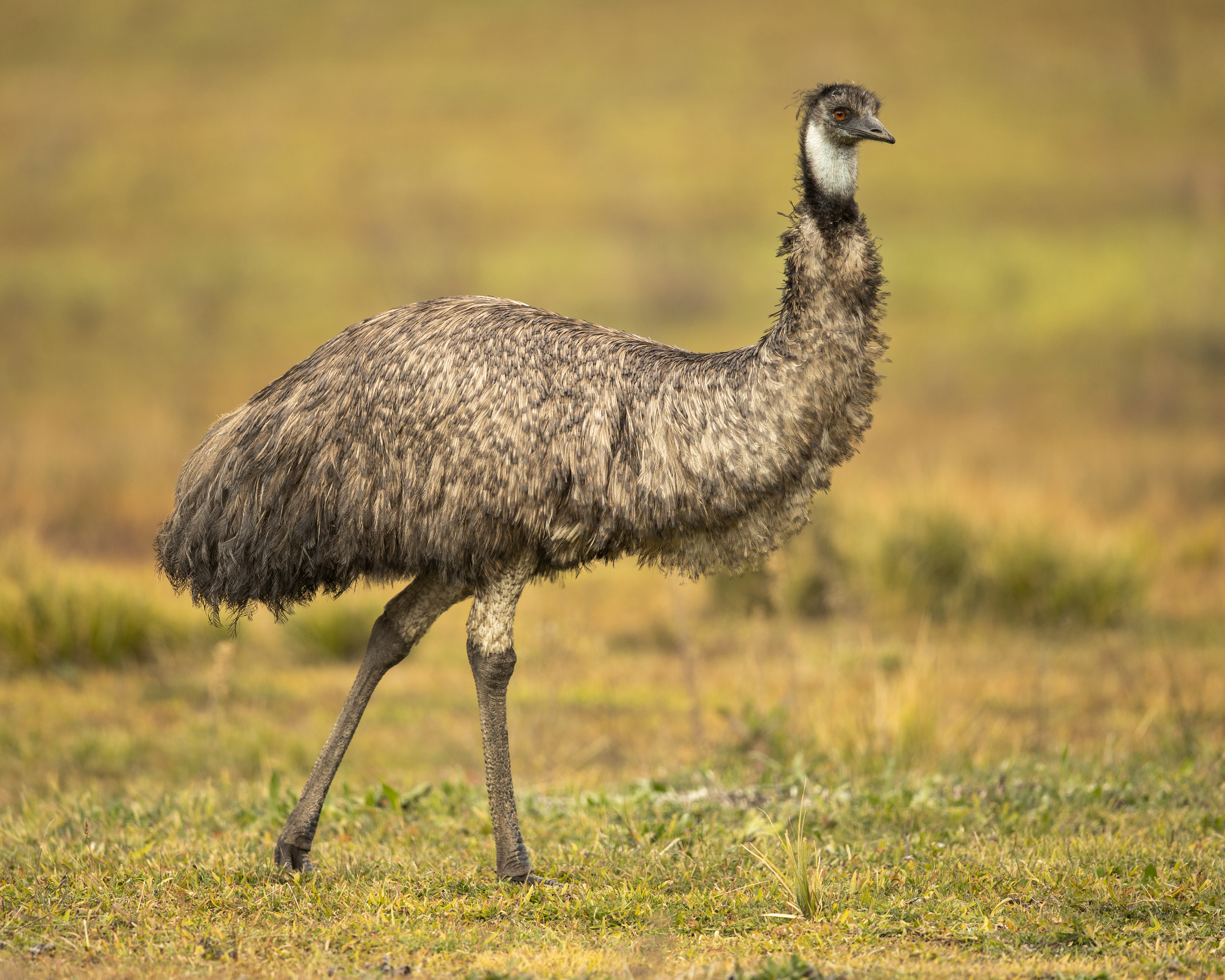
- At Tidbinbilla Nature Reserve, Australian Capital Territory

Conservation status
- Least Concern (IUCN 3.1)

Scientific classification
- Kingdom: Animalia
- Phylum: Chordata
- Class: Aves
- Infraclass: Palaeognathae
- Order: Casuariiformes
- Family: Casuariidae
- Genus: Dromaius
- Species: D. novaehollandiae

Binomial name
- Dromaius novaehollandiae (Latham, 1790)

Subspecies
- D. n. novaehollandiae (Latham, 1790); D. n. rothschildi Mathews, 1912 (disputed); D. n. woodwardi (Mathews, 1912) (disputed); †D. n. baudinianus Parker, S.A., 1984; †D. n. diemenensis Le Souef, 1907; †D. n. minor Spencer, 1906
- Distribution in red

Synonyms
- List: Casuarius novaehollandiae Latham, 1790; Dromiceius novaehollandiae (Latham, 1790); Casuarius australis Shaw, 1792; Dromaius ater Vieillot, 1817; Dromiceius emu Stephens, 1826; Casuarius diemenianus Jennings, 1827; Dromiceius major Brookes, 1830; Dromaeus irroratus Bartlett, 1859; Dromaeus ater (Blyth, 1862)

= Emu =

Emu Temporal range: Middle Miocene – present Miocene–present

Large flightless bird endemic to Australia

Call of a female emu at the ZOOM Erlebniswelt Gelsenkirchen in Germany

The emu (/ˈiːmjuː/; Dromaius novaehollandiae) is a species of flightless bird endemic to Australia, where it is the tallest native bird. It is the only extant member of the genus Dromaius and the third-tallest living bird after its African ratite relatives, the common ostrich and Somali ostrich. The emu's native ranges cover most of the Australian mainland. The Tasmanian, Kangaroo Island and King Island subspecies became extinct after the European settlement of Australia in 1788.

The emu has soft, brown feathers, a long neck, and long legs. It can grow up to 1.9 m (6 ft 3 in) in height. It is a robust bipedal runner that can travel great distances, and when necessary can sprint at 48 km/h (30 mph). It is omnivorous and forages on a variety of plants and insects, and can go for weeks without eating. It drinks infrequently, but takes in copious amounts of fresh water when the opportunity arises.

Breeding takes place in May and June, and fighting among females for a mate is common. Females can mate several times and lay several clutches of eggs in one season. The male incubates the eggs; during this process he hardly eats or drinks and loses a significant amount of weight. The eggs hatch after around eight weeks, and the young are nurtured by their fathers. They reach full size after around six months, but can remain as a family unit until the next breeding season.

The emu is sufficiently common to be rated as a least-concern species by the International Union for Conservation of Nature. Despite this, some local populations are listed as endangered, with all the insular subspecies going extinct by the 1800s. Threats to their survival include egg predation by other animals (especially invasive species), roadkills and habitat fragmentation.

The emu is an important cultural icon of Australia, appearing on the coat of arms and various coinages. The bird features prominently in Indigenous Australian mythologies.

== Etymology ==
The etymology of the common name "emu" is uncertain, but is thought to have come from an Arabic word for large bird that was later used by Portuguese explorers to describe the related cassowary in Australia and New Guinea. Another theory is that it comes from the word "ema", which is used in Portuguese to denote a large bird akin to an ostrich or crane. In Victoria, some terms for the emu were Barrimal in the Dja Dja Wurrung language, myoure in Gunai, and courn in Jardwadjali. The birds were known as murawung or birabayin to the local Eora and Darug inhabitants of the Sydney basin.

== Taxonomy ==
=== History ===
Emus were first reported as having been seen by Europeans when explorers visited the western coast of Australia in 1696. This was during an expedition led by Dutch captain Willem de Vlamingh who was searching for survivors of a ship that had gone missing two years earlier. The birds were known on the eastern coast before 1788, when the first Europeans settled there. The birds were first mentioned under the name of the "New Holland cassowary" in Arthur Phillip's Voyage to Botany Bay, published in 1789 with the following description:

This is a species differing in many particulars from that generally known, and is a much larger bird, standing higher on its legs and having the neck longer than in the common one. Total length seven feet two inches. The bill is not greatly different from that of the common Cassowary; but the horny appendage, or helmet on top of the head, in this species is totally wanting: the whole of the head and neck is also covered with feathers, except the throat and fore part of the neck about half way, which are not so well feathered as the rest; whereas in the common Cassowary the head and neck are bare and carunculated as in the turkey. The plumage in general consists of a mixture of brown and grey, and the feathers are somewhat curled or bent at the ends in the natural state: the wings are so very short as to be totally useless for flight, and indeed, are scarcely to be distinguished from the rest of the plumage, were it not for their standing out a little. The long spines which are seen in the wings of the common sort, are in this not observable,—nor is there any appearance of a tail. The legs are stout, formed much as in the Galeated Cassowary, with the addition of their being jagged or sawed the whole of their length at the back part.

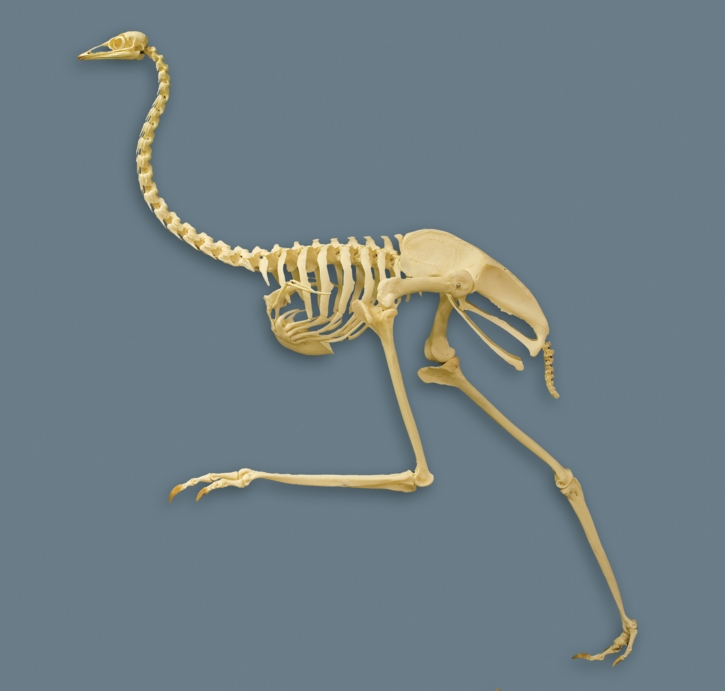
Mounted skeleton

The species was named by ornithologist John Latham in 1790 based on a specimen from the Sydney area of Australia, a country which was known as New Holland at the time. He collaborated on Phillip's book and provided the first descriptions of, and names for, many Australian bird species; Dromaius comes from a Greek word meaning "racer" and novaehollandiae is the Latin term for New Holland, so the name can be rendered as "fast-footed New Hollander". In his original 1816 description of the emu, the French ornithologist Louis Pierre Vieillot used two generic names, first Dromiceius and later Dromaius. It has been a point of contention ever since as to which name should be used; the latter is more correctly formed, but the convention in taxonomy is that the first name given to an organism stands, unless it is clearly a typographical error. Most modern publications, including those of the Australian government, use Dromaius, with Dromiceius mentioned as an alternative spelling.

=== Systematics ===
The emu was long classified, with its closest relatives the cassowaries, in the family Casuariidae, part of the ratite order Struthioniformes. An alternate classification was proposed in 2014 by Mitchell et al., based on analysis of mitochondrial DNA. This splits off the Casuariidae into their own order, the Casuariiformes, and includes only the cassowaries in the family Casuariidae, placing the emus in their own family, Dromaiidae. The cladogram shown below is from their study.

- Recent paleognaths
  - - - - - †Aepyornithidae (elephant birds)
          - Apterygidae (kiwi)
        - - Dromaiidae (emus)
          - Casuariidae (cassowaries)
      - - †Dinornithiformes (moa)
        - Tinamidae (tinamous)
    - Rheidae (rheas)
  - Struthionidae (ostriches)

Two different Dromaius species were present in Australia at the time of European settlement, and one additional species is known from fossil remains. The insular dwarf emus, D. n. baudinianus and D. n. minor, originally present on Kangaroo Island and King Island respectively, both became extinct shortly after the arrival of Europeans. D. n. diemenensis, another insular dwarf emu from Tasmania, became extinct around 1865. The mainland subspecies, D. n. novaehollandiae, remains common. The population of these birds varies from decade to decade, largely being dependent on rainfall; in 2009, it was estimated that there were between 630,000 and 725,000 birds. Emus were introduced to Maria Island off Tasmania, and Kangaroo Island off the coast of South Australia, during the 20th century. The Maria Island population died out in the mid-1990s. The Kangaroo Island birds have successfully established a breeding population.

In 1912, the Australian ornithologist Gregory M. Mathews recognised three living subspecies of emu, D. n. novaehollandiae (Latham, 1790), D. n. woodwardi Mathews, 1912 and D. n. rothschildi Mathews, 1912. The Handbook of the Birds of the World, however, argues that the last two of these subspecies are invalid; natural variations in plumage colour and the nomadic nature of the species make it likely that there is a single race in mainland Australia. Examination of the DNA of the King Island emu shows this bird to be closely related to the mainland emu and hence best treated as a subspecies.

== Description ==
The emu is the second tallest bird in the world, only being exceeded in height by the ostrich; the largest individuals can reach up to 150 to 190 cm (59 to 75 in) in height. Measured from the bill to the tail, emus range in length from 139 to 164 cm (55 to 65 in), with males averaging 148.5 cm (58.5 in) and females averaging 156.8 cm (61.7 in). Emus are the fourth or fifth heaviest living bird after the two species of ostrich and two larger species of cassowary, weighing slightly more on average than an emperor penguin. Adult emus weigh between 18 and 60 kg (40 and 132 lb), with an average of 31.5 and 37 kg (69 and 82 lb) in males and females, respectively. Females are usually slightly larger than males and are substantially wider across the rump.

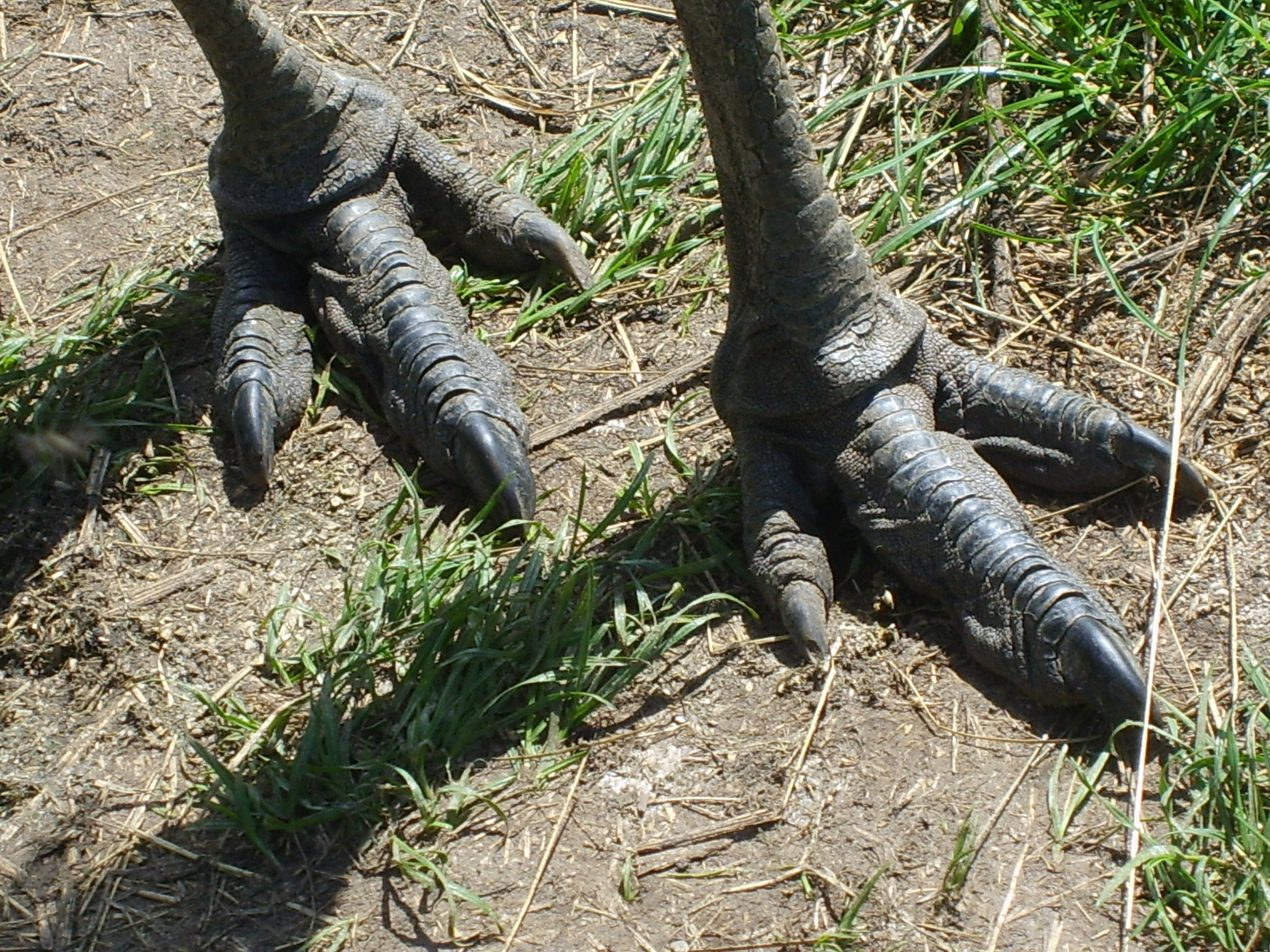
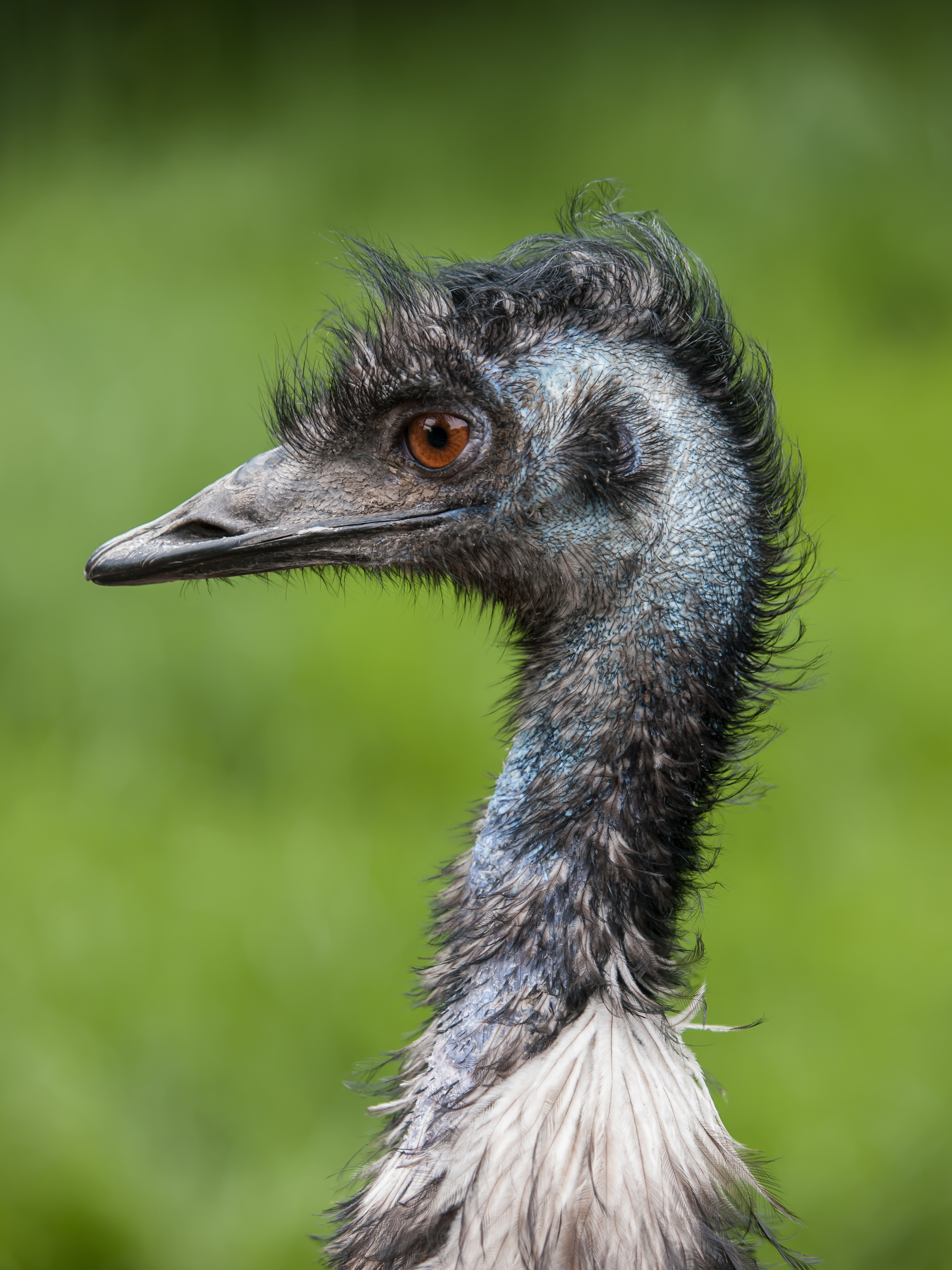
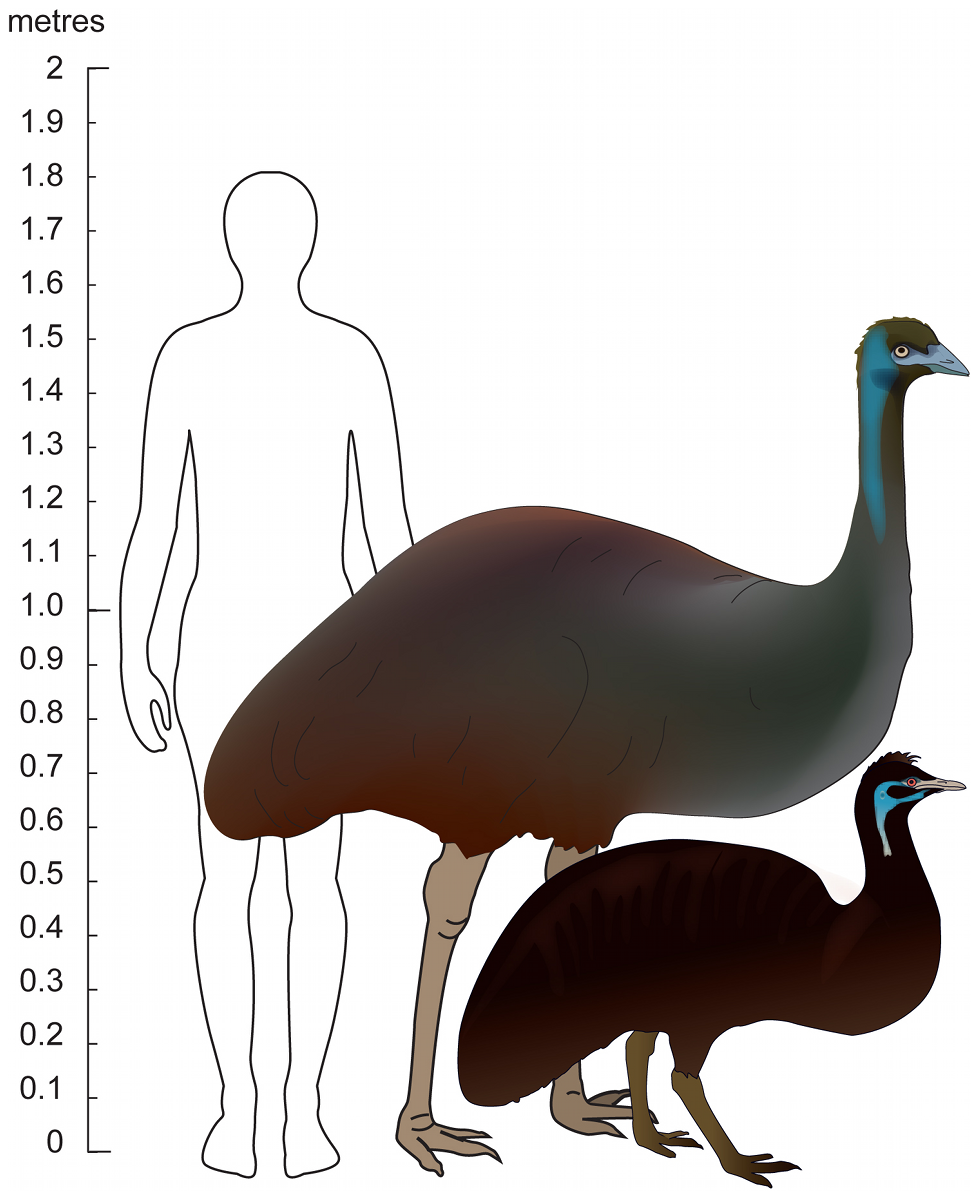
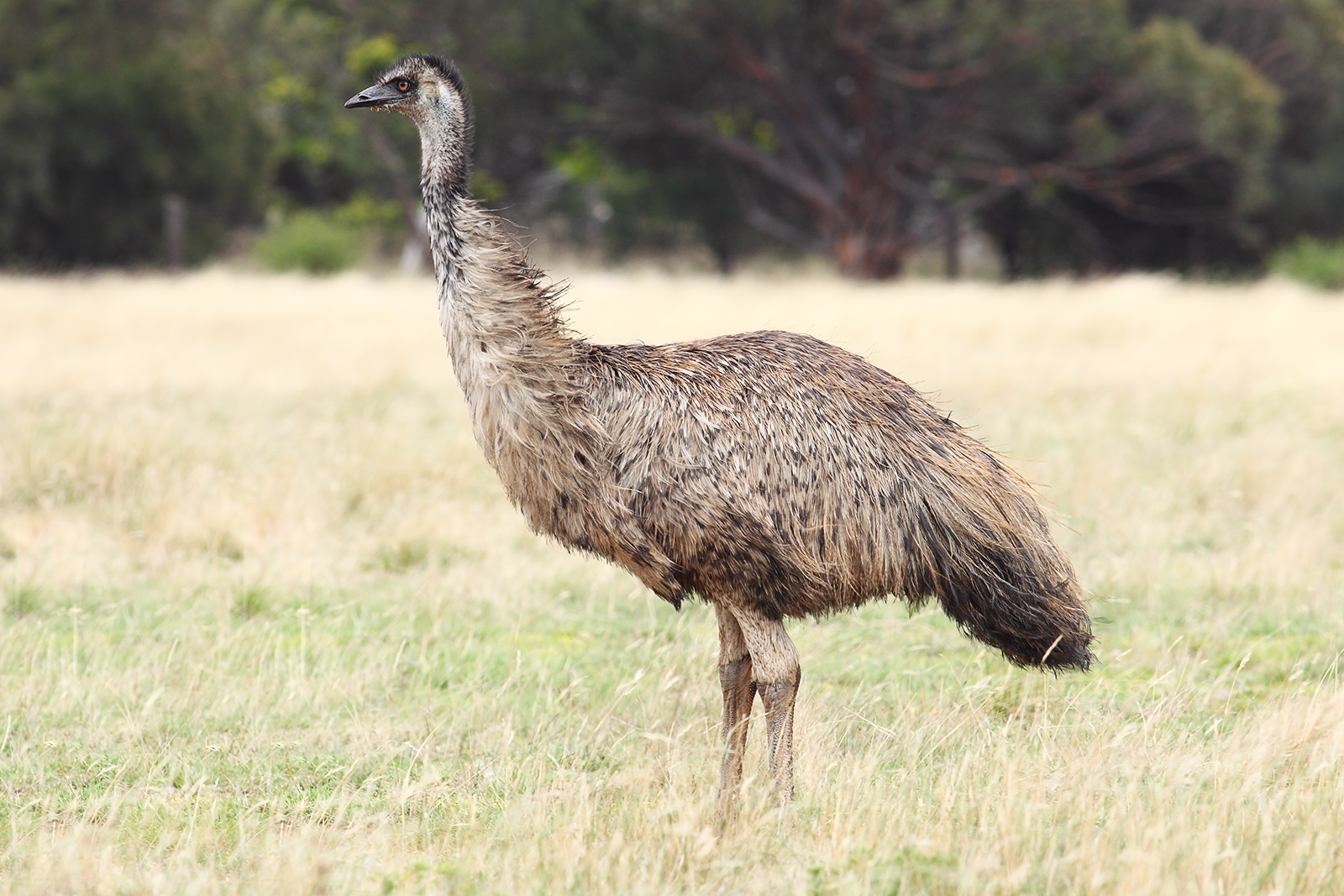
Top left: Emus have three toes on each foot in a tridactyl arrangement, which is an adaptation for running and is seen in other birds, such as bustards and quails. The ostrich has two toes on each foot. Top right: Emu head and upper neck. Bottom left: Size comparison between a human, mainland emu (centre), and extinct King Island subspecies (right). Bottom right: Adult in South Eastern Australia.

Although flightless, emus have vestigial wings, the wing chord measuring around 20 cm (8 in), and each wing having a small claw at the tip. Emus flap their wings when running, perhaps as a means of stabilising themselves when moving fast. They have long necks and legs, and can run at speeds of 48 km/h (30 mph) due to their highly specialised pelvic limb musculature. Their feet have only three toes and a similarly reduced number of bones and associated foot muscles; emus are unique among birds in that their gastrocnemius muscles in the back of the lower legs have four bellies instead of the usual three. The pelvic limb muscles of emus contribute a similar proportion of the total body mass as do the flight muscles of flying birds. When walking, the emu takes strides of about 100 cm (3.3 ft), but at full gallop, a stride can be as long as 275 cm (9 ft). Its legs are devoid of feathers and underneath its feet are thick, cushioned pads. Like the cassowary, the emu has sharp claws on its toes which are its major defensive attribute, and are used in combat to inflict wounds on opponents by kicking. The toe and claw total 15 cm (6 in) in length. The bill is quite small, measuring 5.6 to 6.7 cm (2.2 to 2.6 in), and is soft, being adapted for grazing. Emus have good eyesight and hearing, which allows them to detect threats at some distance.

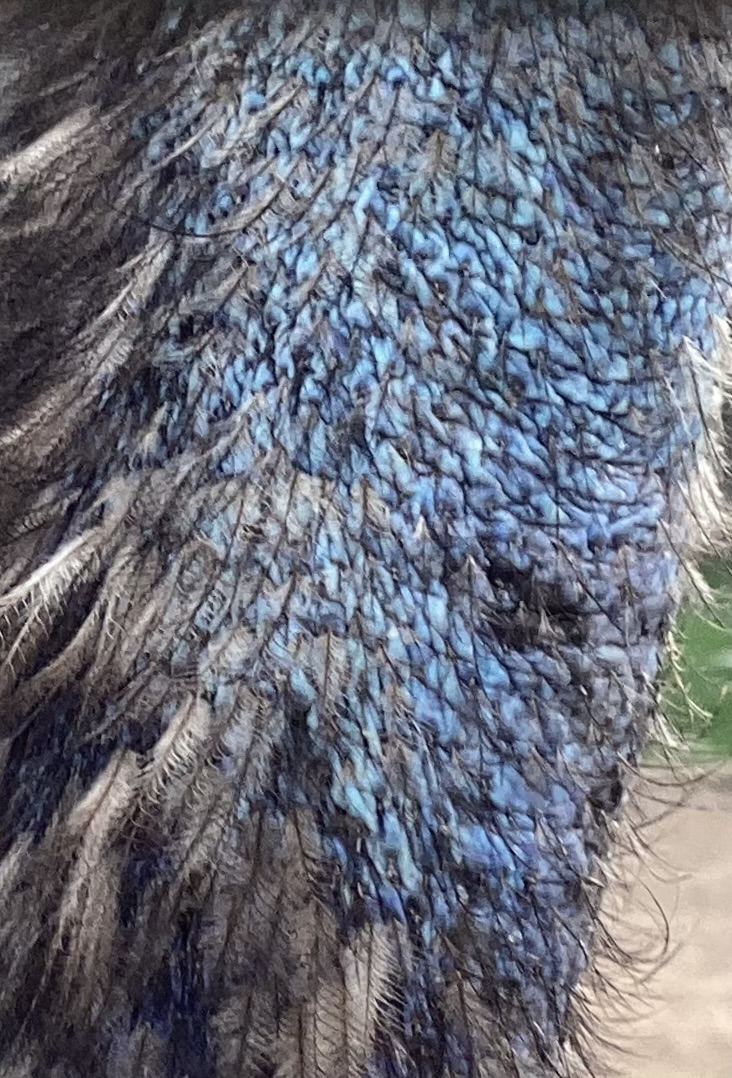
Detail of the skin under its neck from a captive specimen

The neck of the emu is pale blue and shows through its sparse feathers. They have grey-brown plumage of shaggy appearance; the shafts and the tips of the feathers are black. Solar radiation is absorbed by the tips, and the inner plumage insulates the skin. This prevents the birds from overheating, allowing them to be active during the heat of the day. A unique feature of the emu feather is the double rachis emerging from a single shaft. Both of the rachis have the same length, and the texture is variable; the area near the skin is rather furry, but the more distant ends resemble grass. The sexes are similar in appearance, although the male's penis can become visible when he urinates and defecates. The plumage varies in colour due to environmental factors, giving the bird a natural camouflage. Feathers of emus in more arid areas with red soils have a rufous tint while birds residing in damp conditions are generally darker in hue. The juvenile plumage develops at about three months and is blackish finely barred with brown, with the head and neck being especially dark. The facial feathers gradually thin to expose the bluish skin. The adult plumage has developed by about fifteen months.

The eyes of an emu are protected by nictitating membranes. These are translucent, secondary eyelids that move horizontally from the inside edge of the eye to the outside edge. They function as visors to protect the eyes from the dust that is prevalent in windy arid regions. Emus have a tracheal pouch, which becomes more prominent during the mating season. At more than 30 cm (12 in) in length, it is quite spacious; it has a thin wall, and an opening 8 centimetres (3 in) long.

== Distribution and habitat ==
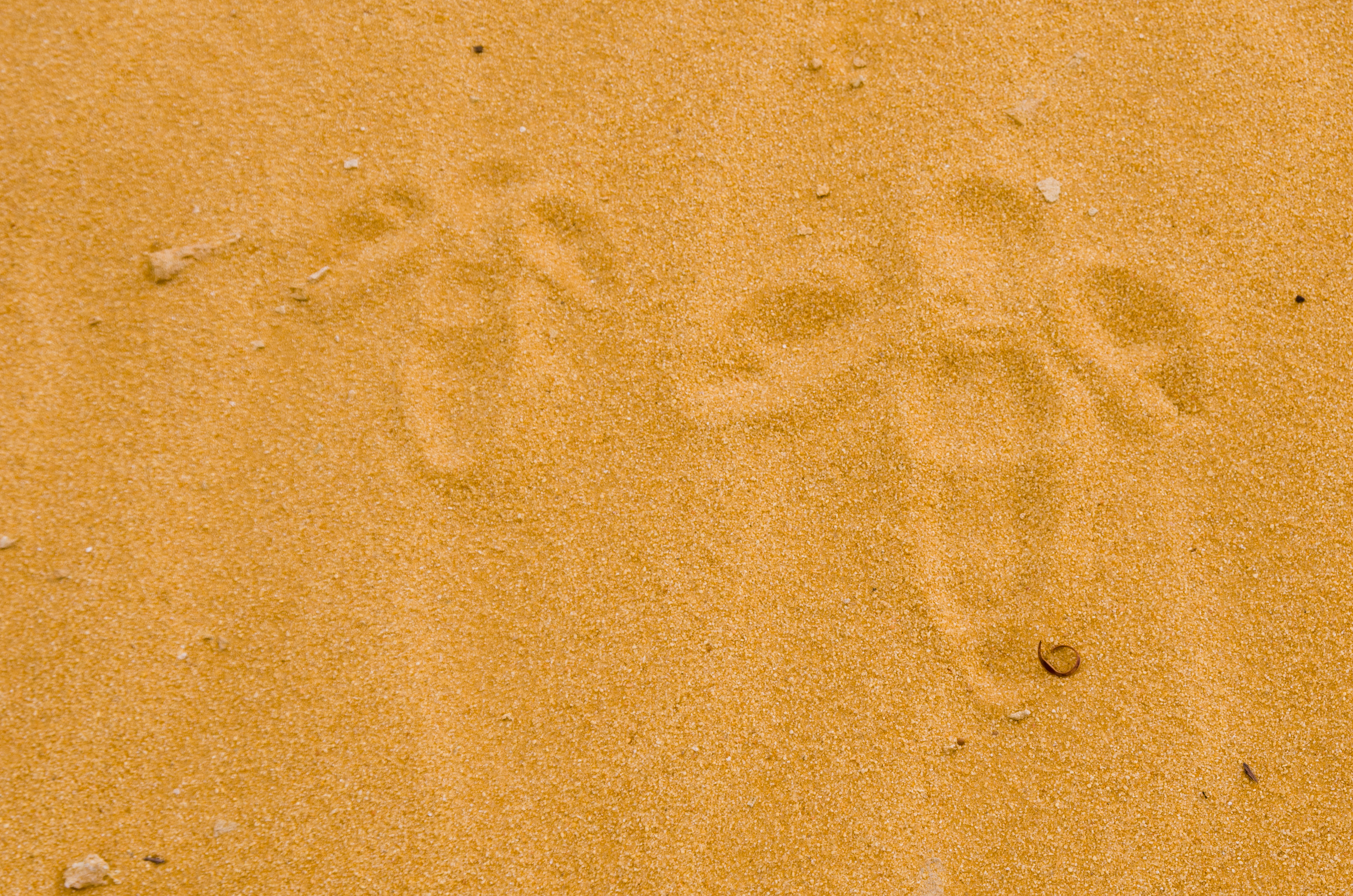
Adult and juvenile footprints

Once common on the east coast of Australia, emus are now uncommon there; by contrast, the development of agriculture and the provision of water for stock in the interior of the continent have increased the range of the emu in arid regions. Emus live in various habitats across Australia both inland and near the coast. They are most common in areas of savannah woodland and sclerophyll forest, and least common in heavily populated districts and arid areas with annual precipitation of less than 600 millimetres (24 in). Emus predominantly travel in pairs, and while they can form large flocks, this is an atypical social behaviour that arises from the common need to move towards a new food source. Emus have been shown to travel long distances to reach abundant feeding areas. In Western Australia, emu movements follow a distinct seasonal pattern – north in summer and south in winter. On the east coast their wanderings seem to be more random and do not appear to follow a set pattern.

== Behaviour and ecology ==
Emus are diurnal birds and spend their day foraging, preening their plumage with their beak, dust bathing and resting. They are generally gregarious birds apart from the breeding season, and while some forage, others remain vigilant to their mutual benefit. They are able to swim when necessary, although they rarely do so unless the area is flooded or they need to cross a river.

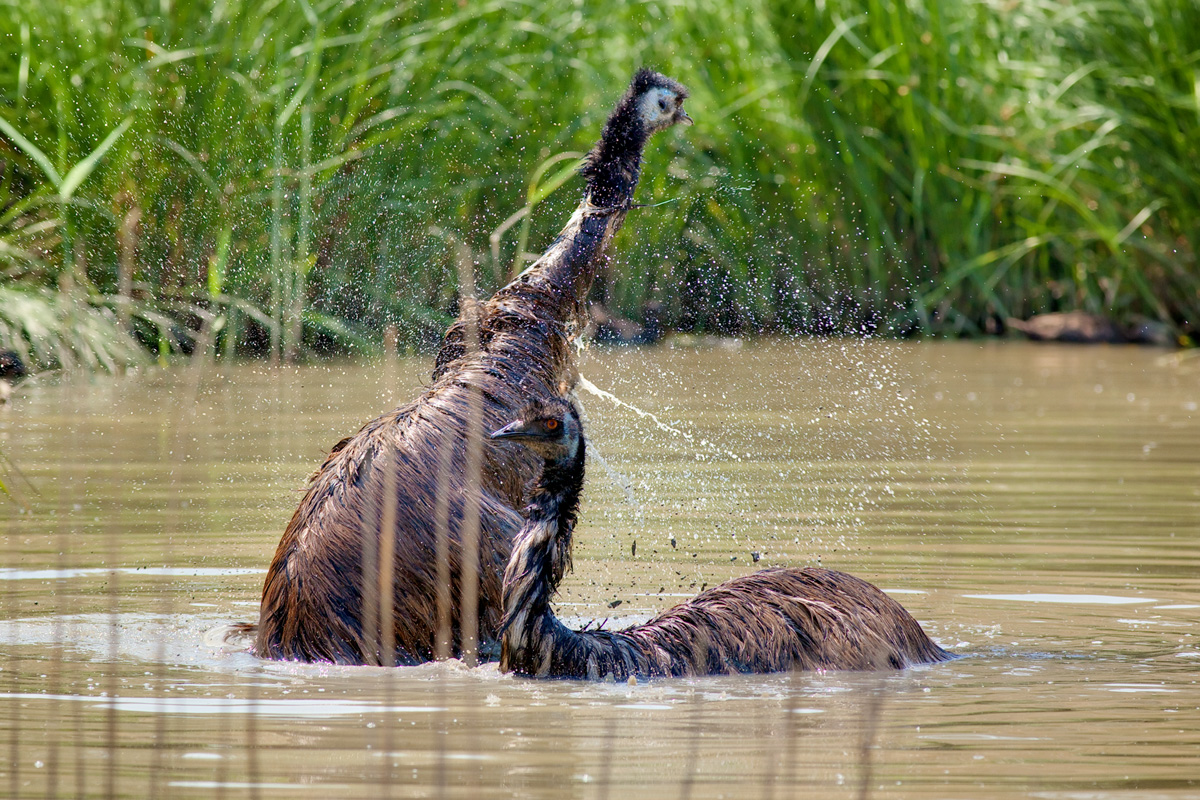
Bathing on a very hot summer day in a shallow pond

Emus begin to settle down at sunset and sleep during the night. They do not sleep continuously but rouse themselves several times during the night. When falling asleep, emus first squat on their tarsi and enter a drowsy state during which they are alert enough to react to stimuli and quickly return to a fully awakened state if disturbed. As they fall into deeper sleep, their neck droops closer to the body and the eyelids begin to close. If there are no disturbances, they fall into a deeper sleep after about twenty minutes. During this phase, the body is gradually lowered until it is touching the ground with the legs folded underneath. The beak is turned down so that the whole neck becomes S-shaped and folded onto itself. The feathers direct any rain downwards onto the ground. It has been suggested that the sleeping position is a type of camouflage, mimicking a small mound. Emus typically awake from deep sleep once every ninety minutes or so and stand upright to feed briefly or defecate. This period of wakefulness lasts for ten to twenty minutes, after which they return to slumber. Overall, an emu sleeps for around seven hours in each twenty-four-hour period. Young emus usually sleep with their neck flat and stretched forward along the ground surface.

Grunting and hissing; note the inflating throat

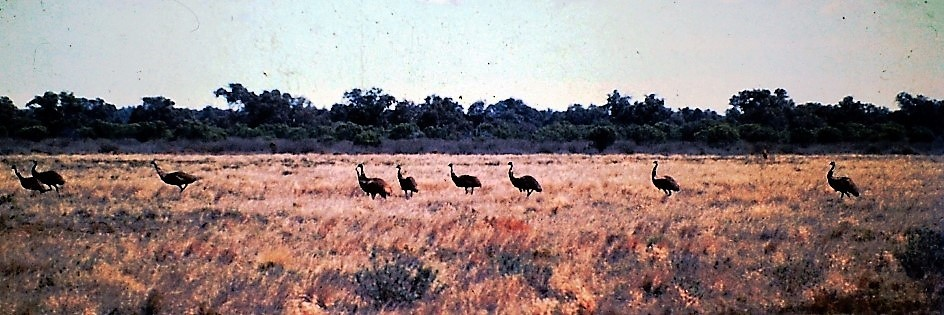
In western New South Wales, 1976

The vocalisations of emus mostly consist of various booming and grunting sounds. The booming is created by the inflatable throat pouch; the pitch can be regulated by the bird and depends on the size of the aperture. Most of the booming is done by females; it is part of the courtship ritual, is used to announce the holding of territory and is issued as a threat to rivals. A high-intensity boom is audible 2 kilometres (1.2 mi) away, while a low, more resonant call, produced during the breeding season, may at first attract mates and peaks while the male is incubating the eggs. Most of the grunting is done by males. It is used principally during the breeding season in territorial defence, as a threat to other males, during courtship and while the female is laying. Both sexes sometimes boom or grunt during threat displays or on encountering strange objects.

On very hot days, emus pant to maintain their body temperature. Their lungs work as evaporative coolers and, unlike some other species, the resulting low levels of carbon dioxide in the blood do not appear to cause alkalosis. For normal breathing in cooler weather, they have large, multifolded nasal passages. Cool air warms as it passes through into the lungs, extracting heat from the nasal region. On exhalation, the emu's cold nasal turbinates condense moisture back out of the air and absorb it for reuse. As with other ratites, the emu has great homeothermic ability, and can maintain this status from −5 to 45 °C (23 to 113 °F). The thermoneutral zone of emus lies between 10 and 30 °C (50 and 86 °F).

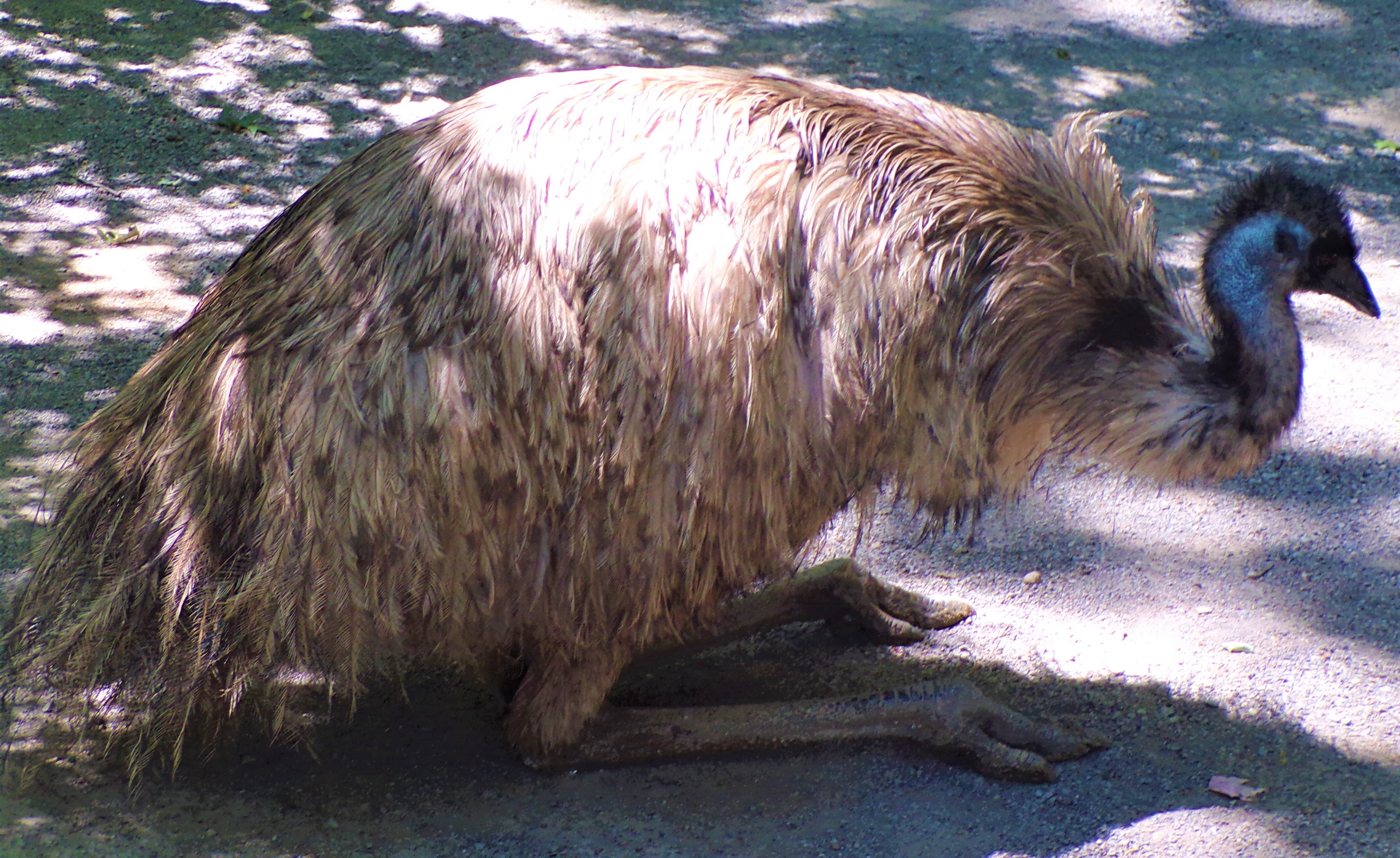
Sitting on the ground at a zoo

As with other ratites, emus have a relatively low basal metabolic rate compared to other types of birds. At −5 °C (23 °F), the metabolic rate of an emu sitting down is about 60% of that when standing, partly because the lack of feathers under the stomach leads to a higher rate of heat loss when standing from the exposed underbelly.

=== Diet ===
Foraging in grass

Emus forage in a diurnal pattern and eat a variety of native and introduced plant species. The diet depends on seasonal availability with such plants as Acacia, Casuarina and grasses being favoured. They also eat insects and other arthropods, including grasshoppers and crickets, beetles, cockroaches, ladybirds, bogong and cotton-boll moth larvae, ants, spiders and millipedes. This provides a large part of their protein requirements. In Western Australia, food preferences have been observed in travelling emus; they eat seeds from Acacia aneura until the rains arrive, after which they move on to fresh grass shoots and caterpillars; in winter they feed on the leaves and pods of Cassia and in spring, they consume grasshoppers and the fruit of Santalum acuminatum, a sort of quandong. They are also known to feed on wheat, and any fruit or other crops that they can access, easily climbing over high fences if necessary. Emus serve as an important agent for the dispersal of large viable seeds, which contributes to floral biodiversity. One undesirable effect of this occurred in Queensland in the early twentieth century when emus fed on the fruit of prickly pears in the outback. They defecated the seeds in various places as they moved around, and this led to a series of campaigns to hunt emus and prevent the seeds of the invasive cactus being spread. The cacti were eventually controlled by an introduced moth (Cactoblastis cactorum) whose larvae fed on the plant, one of the earliest examples of biological control. The δ^{13}C of the emu's diet is reflected in the δ^{13}C of the calcite of its egg shell.

Small stones are swallowed to assist in the grinding up and digestion of the plant material. Individual stones may weigh 45 g (1.6 oz) and the birds may have as much as 745 g (1.642 lb) in their gizzards at one time. They also eat charcoal, although the reason for this is unclear. Captive emus have been known to eat shards of glass, marbles, car keys, jewellery and nuts and bolts.

Emus drink infrequently but ingest large amounts when the opportunity arises. They typically drink once a day, first inspecting the water body and surrounding area in groups before kneeling down at the edge to drink. They prefer being on firm ground while drinking, rather than on rocks or mud, but if they sense danger, they often stand rather than kneel. If not disturbed, they may drink continuously for ten minutes. Due to the scarcity of water sources, emus are sometimes forced to go without water for several days. In the wild, they often share water holes with other animals such as kangaroos; they are wary and tend to wait for the other animals to leave before drinking.

=== Breeding ===
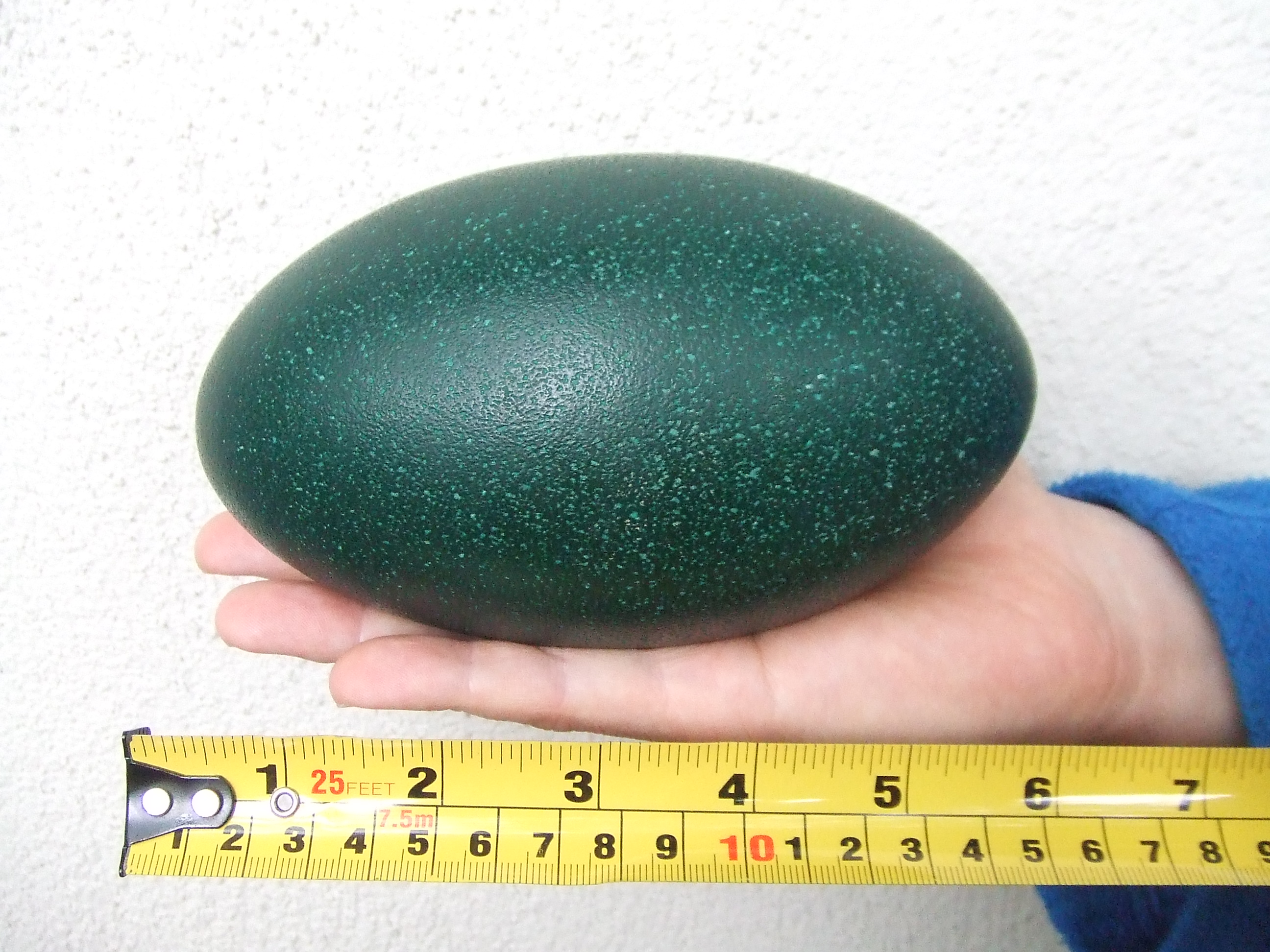
Dark green egg

Emus form breeding pairs during the summer months of December and January and may remain together for about five months. During this time, they stay in an area a few kilometres in diameter and it is believed they find and defend territory within this area. Both males and females put on weight during the breeding season, with the female becoming slightly heavier at between 45 and 58 kg (99 and 128 lb). Mating usually takes place between April and June; the exact timing is determined by the climate as the birds nest during the coolest part of the year. During the breeding season, males experience hormonal changes, including an increase in luteinising hormone and testosterone levels, and their testicles double in size.

Males construct a rough nest in a semi-sheltered hollow on the ground, using bark, grass, sticks and leaves to line it. The nest is almost always a flat surface rather than a segment of a sphere, although in cold conditions the nest is taller, up to 7 cm (2.8 in) tall, and more spherical to provide some extra heat retention. When other material is lacking, the bird sometimes uses a spinifex tussock a metre or so across, despite the prickly nature of the foliage. The nest can be placed on open ground or near a shrub or rock. The nest is usually placed in an area where the emu has a clear view of its surroundings and can detect approaching predators. The nest can contain eggs from multiple emus: the number is usually between 15 and 25 eggs.

Female emus court the males; the female's plumage darkens slightly and the small patches of bare, featherless skin just below the eyes and near the beak turn turquoise-blue. The colour of the male's plumage remains unchanged, although the bare patches of skin also turn light blue. When courting, females stride around, pulling their neck back while puffing out their feathers and emitting low, monosyllabic calls that have been compared to drum beats. This calling can occur when males are out of sight or more than 50 metres (160 ft) away. Once the male's attention has been gained, the female circles her prospective mate at a distance of 10 to 40 metres (30 to 130 ft). As she does this, she looks at him by turning her neck, while at the same time keeping her rump facing towards him. If the male shows interest in the parading female, he will move closer; the female continues the courtship by shuffling further away but continuing to circle him.

If a male is interested, he will stretch his neck and erect his feathers, then bend over and peck at the ground. He will circle around and sidle up to the female, swaying his body and neck from side to side, and rubbing his breast against his partner's rump. Often the female will reject his advances with aggression, but if amenable, she signals acceptance by squatting down and raising her rump.

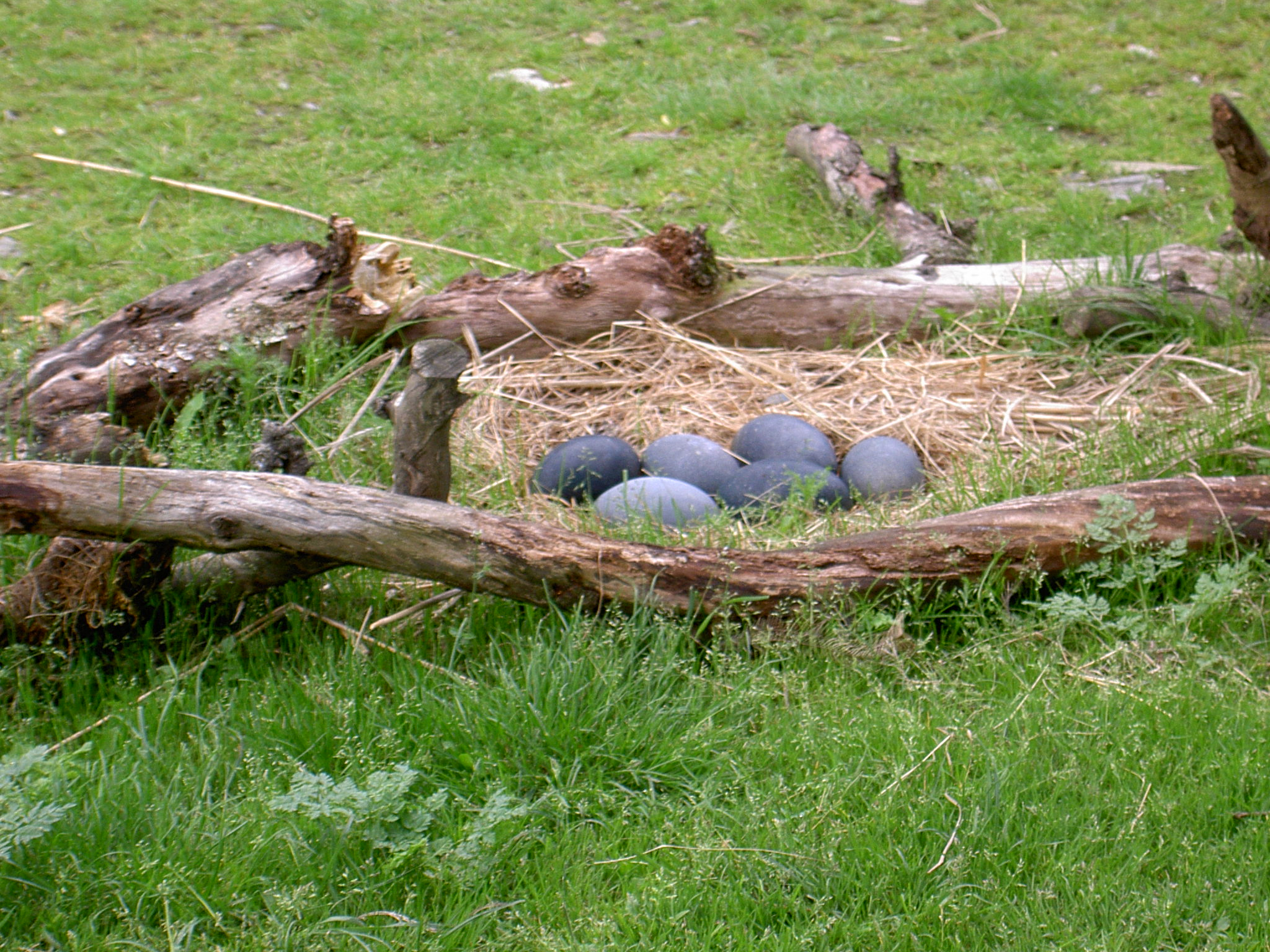
Nest and eggs

Females are more aggressive than males during the courtship period, often fighting for access to mates, with fights among females accounting for more than half the aggressive interactions during this period. If females court a male that already has a partner, the incumbent female will try to repel the competitor, usually by chasing and kicking. These interactions can be prolonged, lasting up to five hours, especially when the male being fought over is single and neither female has the advantage of incumbency. In these cases, the females typically intensify their calls and displays.

The sperm from a mating is stored by the female and can suffice to fertilise about six eggs. The pair mate every day or two, and every second or third day the female lays one of a clutch of five to fifteen very large, thick-shelled, green eggs. The shell is around 1 mm (0.04 in) thick, but rather thinner in northern regions according to indigenous Australians. The shell is substantially composed of calcite, and its δ^{13}C is a function of the emu's diet. The eggs are on average 13 cm × 9 cm (5.1 in × 3.5 in) and weigh between 450 and 650 g (1.0 and 1.4 lb). The maternal investment in the egg is considerable, and the proportion of yolk to albumen, at about 50%, is greater than would be predicted for a precocial egg of this size. This probably relates to the long incubation period which means the developing chick must consume greater resources before hatching. The first verified occurrence of genetically identical avian twins was demonstrated in the emu. The egg surface is granulated and pale green. During the incubation period, the egg turns dark green, although if the egg never hatches, it will turn white from the bleaching effect of the sun.

The male becomes broody after his mate starts laying, and may begin to incubate the eggs before the clutch is complete. From this time on, he does not eat, drink, or defecate, and stands only to turn the eggs, which he does about ten times a day. He develops a brood patch, a bare area of wrinkled skin which is in intimate contact with the eggs. Over the course of the eight-week incubation period, he will lose a third of his weight and will survive on stored body fat and on any morning dew that he can reach from the nest. As with many other Australian birds, such as the superb fairywren, infidelity is the norm for emus, despite the initial pair bond: once the male starts brooding, the female usually wanders off, and may mate with other males and lay in multiple nests; thus, as many as half the chicks in a brood may not be fathered by the incubating male, or even by either parent, as emus also exhibit brood parasitism.

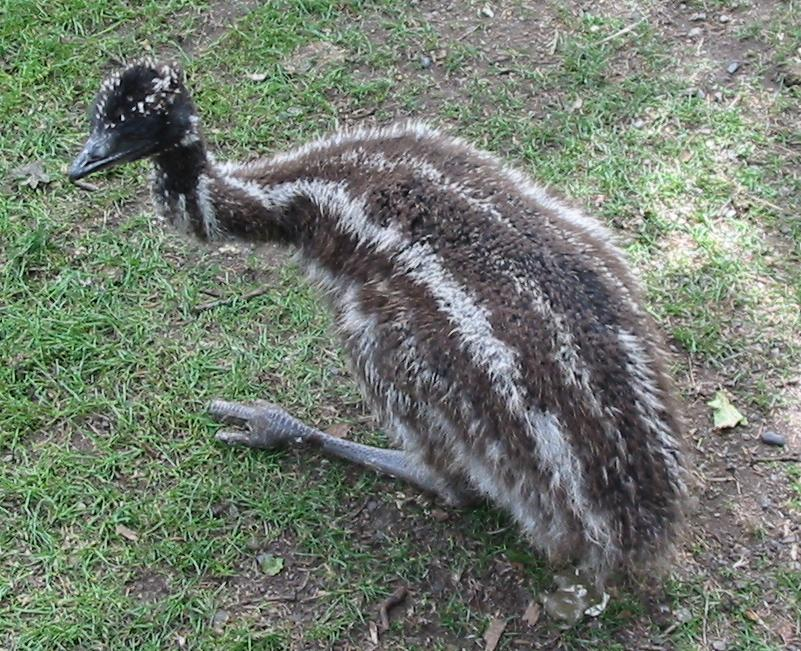
Chicks have longitudinal stripes that provide camouflage.

Some females stay and defend the nest until the chicks start hatching, but most leave the nesting area completely to nest again; in a good season, a female emu may nest three times. If the parents stay together during the incubation period, they will take turns standing guard over the eggs while the other drinks and feeds within earshot. If it perceives a threat during this period, it will lie down on top of the nest and try to blend in with the similar-looking surrounds, and suddenly stand up to confront and scare the other party if it comes close.

Incubation takes 56 days, and the male stops incubating the eggs shortly before they hatch. The temperature of the nest rises slightly during the eight-week period. Although the eggs are laid sequentially, they tend to hatch within two days of one another, as the eggs that were laid later experienced higher temperatures and developed more rapidly. During the process, the precocial emu chicks need to develop a capacity for thermoregulation. During incubation, the embryos are kept at a constant temperature but the chicks will need to be able to cope with varying external temperatures by the time they hatch.

Newly hatched chicks are active and can leave the nest within a few days of hatching. They stand about 12 cm (5 in) tall at first, weigh 0.5 kg (17.6 oz), and have distinctive brown and cream stripes for camouflage, which fade after three months or so. The male guards the growing chicks for up to seven months, teaching them how to find food. Chicks grow very quickly and are fully grown in five to six months; they may remain with their family group for another six months or so before they split up to breed in their second season. During their early life, the young emus are defended by their father, who adopts a belligerent stance towards other emus, including the mother. He does this by ruffling his feathers, emitting sharp grunts, and kicking his legs to drive off other animals. He can also bend his knees to crouch over smaller chicks to protect them. At night, he envelops his young with his feathers. As the young emus cannot travel far, the parents must choose an area with plentiful food in which to breed. In the wild, emus can live for upwards of 10 years but in captivity, they can live up to 20 years.

=== Predation ===
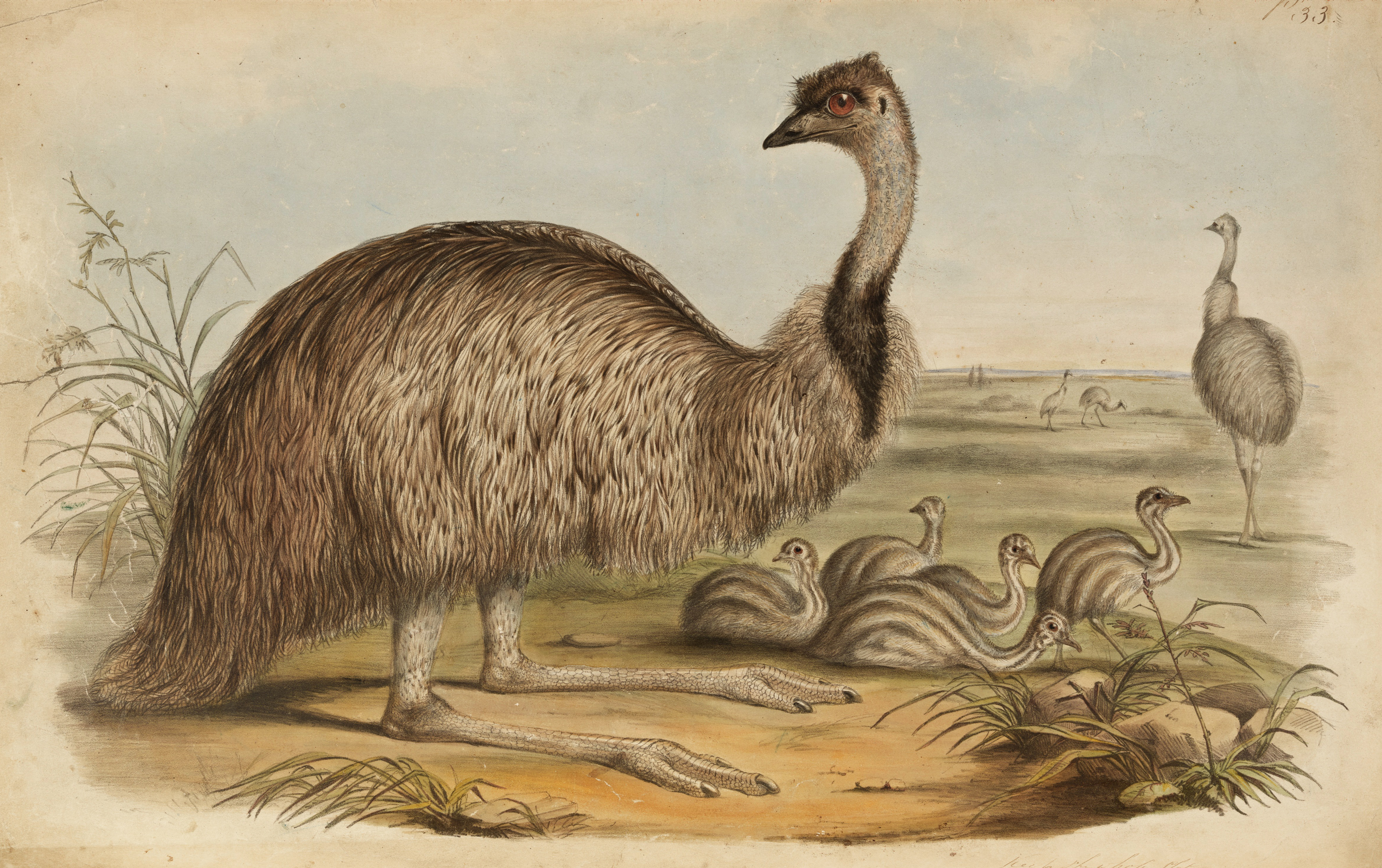
Adult and chicks, from The Birds of Australia, John Gould, 1848

There are few native natural predators of adult emus still extant. Early in its species history it may have faced numerous terrestrial predators now extinct, including the giant lizard Megalania, the thylacine, and possibly other carnivorous marsupials, which may explain their seemingly well-developed ability to defend themselves from terrestrial predators. The main predator of emus today is the dingo, which was originally introduced by Aboriginals thousands of years ago from a stock of semi-domesticated wolves. Dingoes try to kill the emu by attacking the head. The emu typically tries to repel the dingo by jumping into the air and kicking or stamping the dingo on its way down. The emu jumps as the dingo barely has the capacity to jump high enough to threaten its neck, so a correctly timed leap to coincide with the dingo's lunge can keep its head and neck out of danger. Despite the potential prey-predator relationship, the presence of predaceous dingoes does not appear to heavily influence emu numbers, with other natural conditions just as likely to cause mortality. Wedge-tailed eagles are the only avian predator capable of attacking fully-grown emus, though are perhaps most likely to take small or young specimens. The eagles attack emus by swooping downwards rapidly and at high speed and aiming for the head and neck. In this case, the emu's jumping technique as employed against the dingo is not useful. The birds try to target the emu in the open ground so that it cannot hide behind obstacles. Under such circumstances, the emu runs in a chaotic manner and changes directions frequently to try to evade its attacker. While full-grown adults are rarely preyed upon, dingos, raptors, monitor lizards, introduced red foxes, feral and domestic dogs, and feral pigs occasionally feed on emu eggs or kill small chicks. Adult males fiercely defend their chicks from predators, especially dingos and foxes.

=== Parasites ===
Emus can suffer from both external and internal parasites, but under farmed conditions are more parasite-free than ostriches or rheas. External parasites include the louse Dahlemhornia asymmetrica and various other lice, ticks, mites and flies. Chicks sometimes suffer from intestinal tract infections caused by coccidian protozoa, and the nematode Trichostrongylus tenuis infects the emu as well as a wide range of other birds, causing haemorrhagic diarrhoea. Other nematodes are found in the trachea and bronchi; Syngamus trachea causing haemorrhagic tracheitis and Cyathostoma variegatum causing serious respiratory problems in juveniles.

== Relationship with humans ==
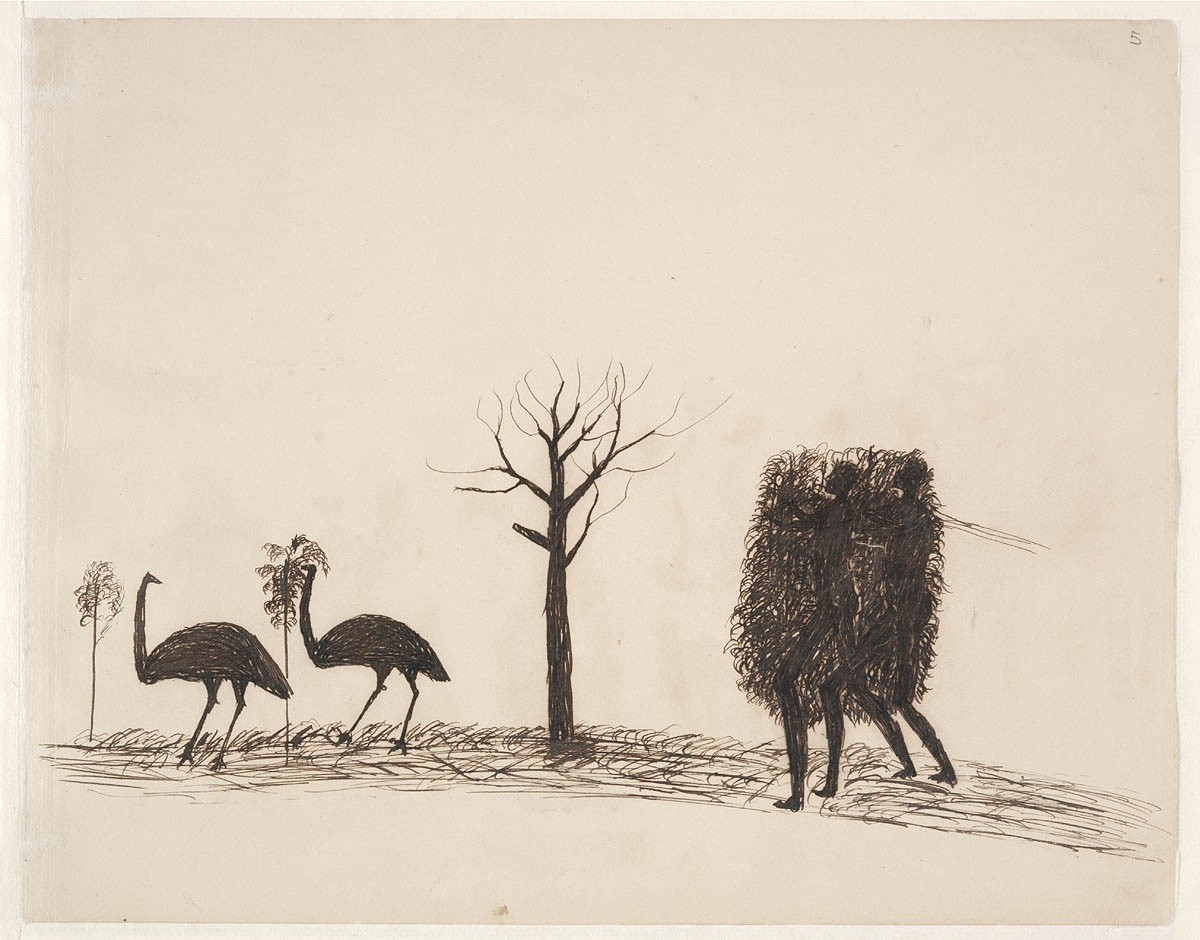
Stalking emu, c. 1885, attributed to Tommy McRae

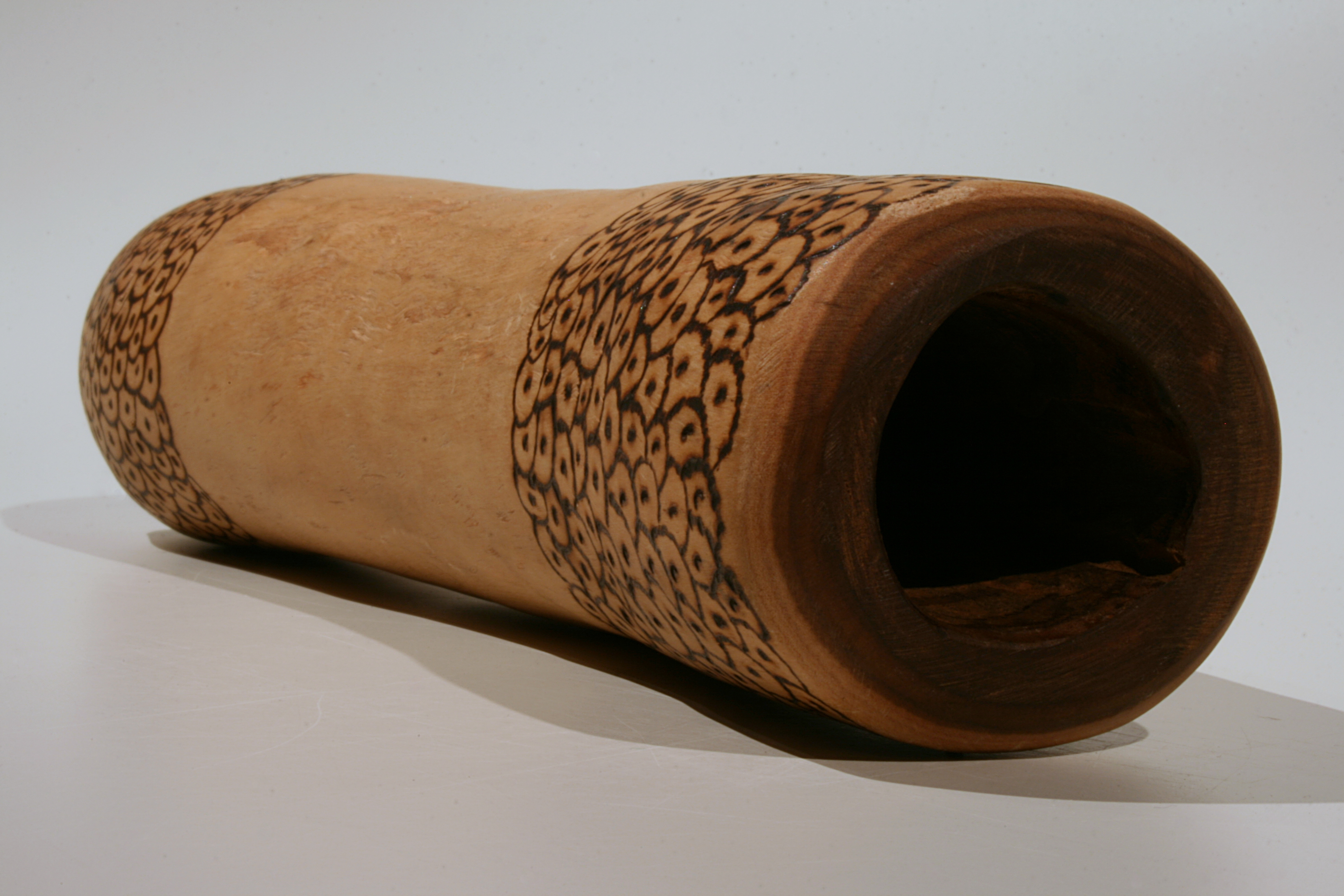
Aboriginal emu caller, used to arouse the curiosity of emus

Emus were used as a source of food by indigenous Australians and early European settlers. Emus are inquisitive birds and have been known to approach humans if they see unexpected movement of a limb or piece of clothing. In the wild, they may follow and observe people. Aboriginal Australians used a variety of techniques to catch the birds, including spearing them while they drank at waterholes, catching them in nets, and attracting them by imitating their calls or by arousing their curiosity with a ball of feathers and rags dangled from a tree. The pitchuri thornapple (Duboisia hopwoodii), or some similar poisonous plant, could be used to contaminate a waterhole, after which the disoriented emus were easy to catch. Another stratagem was for the hunter to use a skin as a disguise, and the birds could be lured into a camouflaged pit trap using rags or imitation calls. Aboriginal Australians only killed emus out of necessity, and frowned on anyone who hunted them for any other reason. Every part of the carcass had some use; the fat was harvested for its valuable, multiple-use oil, the bones were shaped into knives and tools, the feathers were used for body adornment and the tendons substituted for string.

The early European settlers killed emus to provide food and used their fat for fuelling lamps. They also tried to prevent them from interfering with farming or invading settlements in search of water during drought. An extreme example of this was the Emu War in Western Australia in 1932. Emus flocked to the Chandler and Walgoolan area during a dry spell, damaging rabbit fencing and devastating crops. An attempt to drive them off was mounted, with the army called in to dispatch them with machine guns; the emus largely avoided the hunters. Emus are large, powerful birds, and their legs are among the strongest of any animal and powerful enough to tear down metal fencing. The birds are very defensive of their young, and there have been two documented cases of humans being attacked by emus.

=== Economic value ===
In the areas in which it was endemic, the emu was an important source of meat to Aboriginal Australians. They used the fat as bush medicine and rubbed it into their skin. It served as a valuable lubricant, was used to oil wooden tools and utensils such as the coolamon, and was mixed with ochre to make the traditional paint for ceremonial body adornment. Their eggs were also foraged for food.

An example of how the emu was cooked comes from the Arrernte of Central Australia who called it Kere ankerre:

Emus are around all the time, in green times and dry times. You pluck the feathers out first, then pull out the crop from the stomach, and put in the feathers you've pulled out, and then singe it on the fire. You wrap the milk guts that you've pulled out into something [such as] gum leaves and cook them. When you've got the fat off, you cut the meat up and cook it on fire made from river red gum wood.

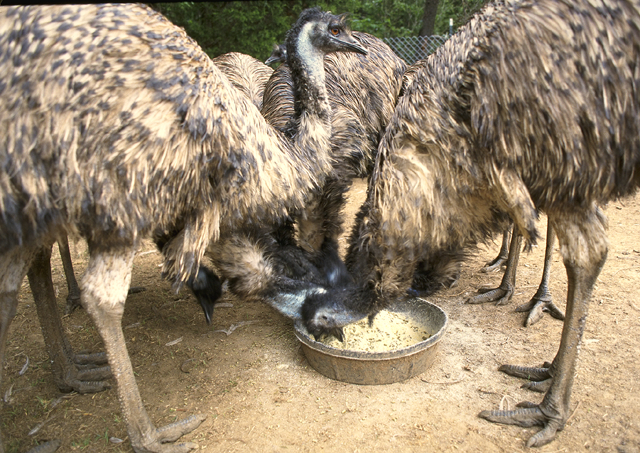
Farmed emu being grain fed

The birds were a food and fuel source for early European settlers, and are now farmed, in Australia and elsewhere, for their meat, oil and leather. Commercial emu farming started in Western Australia around 1970. The commercial industry in the country is based on stock bred in captivity, and all states except Tasmania have licensing requirements to protect wild emus. Outside Australia, emus are farmed on a large scale in North America, with about 1 million birds in the US, Peru, and China, and to a lesser extent in some other countries. Emus breed well in captivity, and are kept in large open pens to avoid the leg and digestive problems that arise from inactivity. They are typically fed on grain supplemented by grazing, and are slaughtered at 15 to 18 months.

The Salem district administration in India advised farmers in 2012 not to invest in the emu business which was being heavily promoted at the time; further investigation was needed to assess the profitability of farming the birds in India. In the United States, it was reported in 2013 that many ranchers had left the emu business; it was estimated that the number of growers had dropped from over five thousand in 1998 to one or two thousand in 2013. The remaining growers increasingly rely on sales of oil for their profit, although, leather, eggs, and meat are also sold.

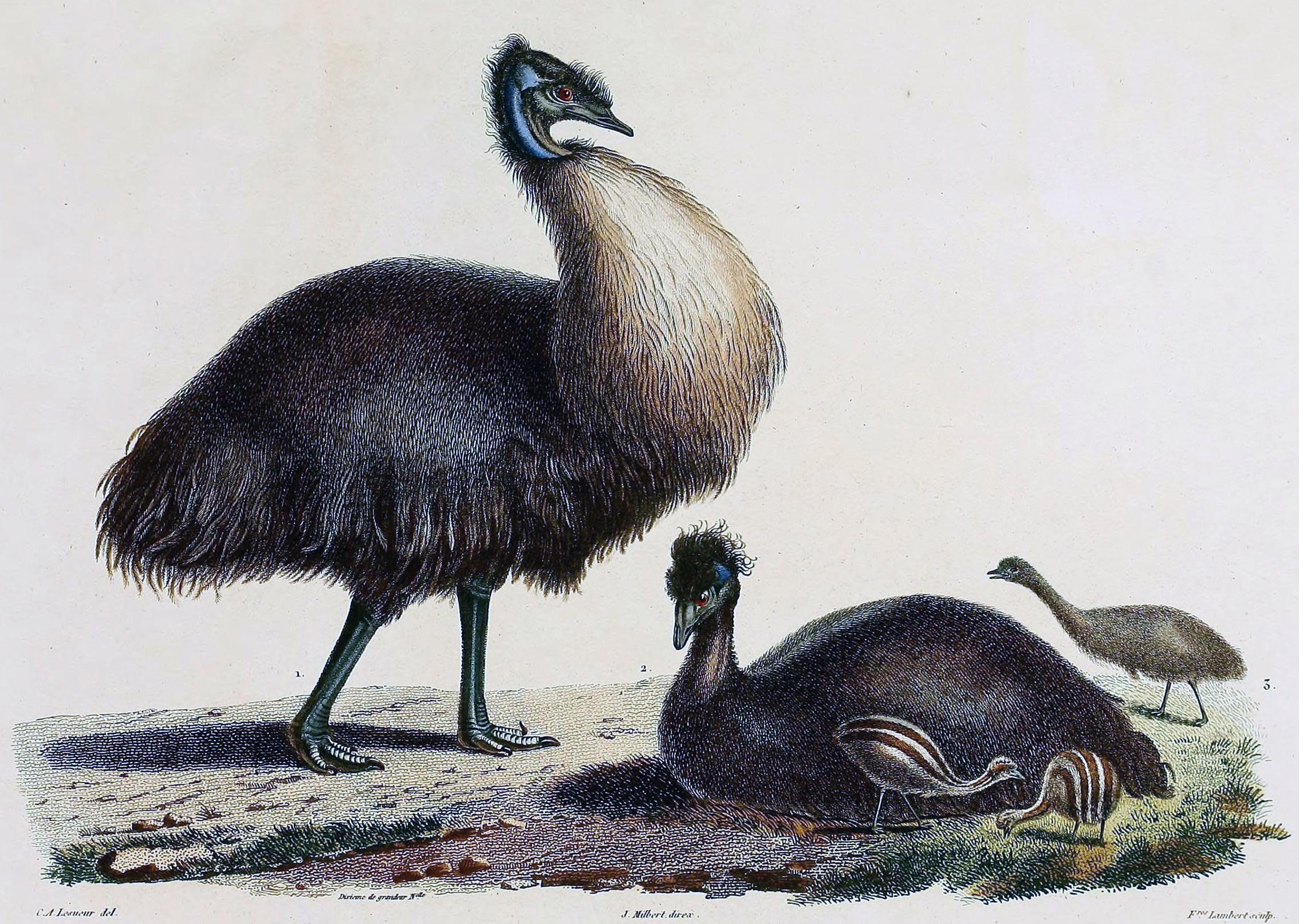
1807 plate showing now-extinct island emus taken to France for breeding purposes in 1804

Emus are farmed primarily for their meat, leather, feathers and oil, and 95% of the carcass can be used. Emu meat is a low-fat product (less than 1.5% fat), and is comparable to other lean meats. Most of the usable portions (the best cuts come from the thigh and the larger muscles of the drum or lower leg) are, like other poultry, dark meat; emu meat is considered for cooking purposes by the US Food and Drug Administration to be a red meat because its red colour and pH value approximate that of beef, but for inspection purposes it is considered to be poultry. Emu fat is rendered to produce oil for cosmetics, dietary supplements, and therapeutic products. The oil is obtained from the subcutaneous and retroperitoneal fat; the macerated adipose tissue is heated and the liquefied fat is filtered to get a clear oil. This consists mainly of fatty acids of which oleic acid (42%), linoleic and palmitic acids (21% each) are the most prominent components. It also contains various anti-oxidants, notably carotenoids and flavones.

There is some evidence that the oil has anti-inflammatory properties; however, there have not yet been extensive tests, and the USDA regards pure emu oil as an unapproved drug and highlighted it in a 2009 article entitled "How to Spot Health Fraud". Nevertheless, the oil has been linked to the easing of gastrointestinal inflammation, and tests on rats have shown that it has a significant effect in treating arthritis and joint pain, more so than olive or fish oils. It has been scientifically shown to improve the rate of wound healing, but the mechanism responsible for this effect is not understood. A 2008 study has claimed that emu oil has a better anti-oxidative and anti-inflammatory potential than ostrich oil, and linked this to emu oil's higher proportion of unsaturated to saturated fatty acids. While there are no scientific studies showing that emu oil is effective in humans, it is marketed and promoted as a dietary supplement with a wide variety of claimed health benefits. Commercially marketed emu oil supplements are poorly standardised.

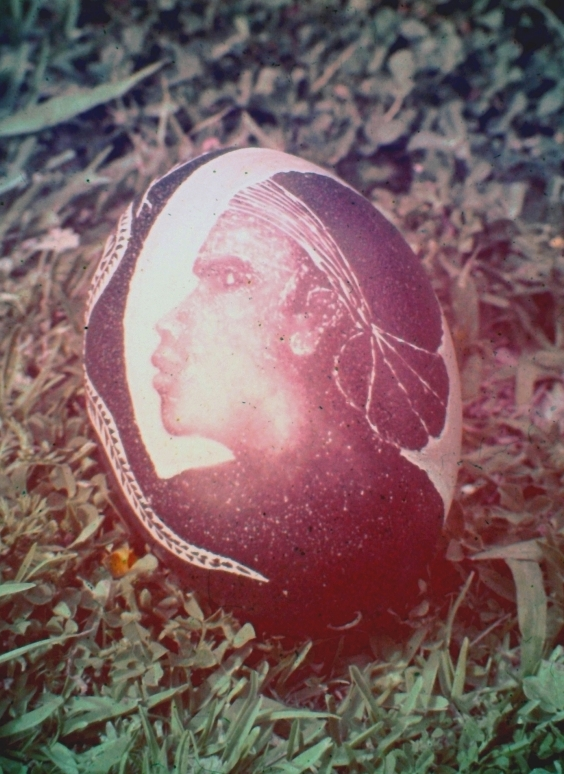
Engraved egg

Emu leather has a distinctive patterned surface, due to a raised area around the feather follicles in the skin; the leather is used in such items as wallets, handbags, shoes and clothes, often in combination with other leathers. The feathers and eggs are used in decorative arts and crafts. In particular, emptied emu eggs have been engraved with portraits, similar to cameos, and scenes of Australian native animals. Mounted Emu eggs and emu-egg containers in the form of hundreds of goblets, inkstands and vases were produced in the second half of the nineteenth century, all richly embellished with images of Australian flora, fauna and indigenous people by travelling silversmiths, founders of a 'new Australian grammar of ornament'. They continued longstanding traditions that can be traced back to the European mounted ostrich eggs of the thirteenth century and Christian symbolism and notions of virginity, fertility, faith and strength. For a society of proud settlers who sought to bring culture and civilisation to their new world, the traditional ostrich-egg goblet, freed from its roots in a society dominated by court culture, was creatively made novel in the Australian colonies as forms and functions were invented to make the objects attractive to a new, broader audience. Significant designers Adolphus Blau, Julius Hogarth, Ernest Leviny, Julius Schomburgk, Johann Heinrich Steiner, Christian Quist, Joachim Matthias Wendt, William Edwards and others had the technical training on which to build flourishing businesses in a country rich in raw materials and a clientele hungry for old-world paraphernalia.

In addition to their use in farming, emus are sometimes kept as pets, though they require adequate space and food in order to live healthily. Emus were formerly subject to regulation in the United Kingdom under the Dangerous Wild Animals Act; however, a review of the act in 2007 led to changes that allow emus (alongside a number of other animals that were also regulated under the act) to be kept without a license, as they were no longer considered to be dangerous.

=== Cultural references ===
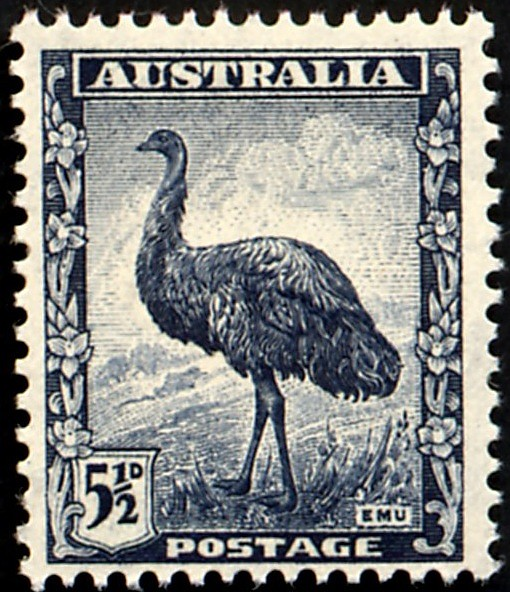
Top: The "Emu in the sky". In Western astronomy terms, Southern Cross is on the right; Scorpius on the left; the emu's head is the Coalsack.
Bottom left: Coat of arms of Australia. Bottom right: The emu on a postage stamp of Australia issued in 1942.

The emu has a prominent place in Australian Aboriginal mythology, including a creation myth of the Yuwaalaraay and other groups in New South Wales who say that the sun was made by throwing an emu's egg into the sky; the bird features in numerous aetiological stories told across a number of Aboriginal groups. One story from Western Australia holds that a man once annoyed a small bird, who responded by throwing a boomerang, severing the arms of the man and transforming him into a flightless emu. The Kurdaitcha man of Central Australia is said to wear sandals made of emu feathers to mask his footprints. Many Aboriginal language groups throughout Australia have a tradition that the dark dust lanes in the Milky Way represent a giant emu in the sky. Several of the Sydney rock engravings depict emus, and the birds are mimicked in Indigenous dances. Hunting emus, known as kari in the Kaurna language, features in the major Dreaming story of the Kaurna people of the Adelaide region about the ancestor hero Tjilbruke.

The emu is popularly but unofficially considered as a faunal emblem – the national bird of Australia. It appears as a shield bearer on the Coat of arms of Australia with the red kangaroo, and as a part of the Arms also appears on the Australian 50-cent coin. It has featured on numerous Australian postage stamps, including a pre-federation New South Wales 100th Anniversary issue from 1888, which featured a 2 pence blue emu stamp, a 36-cent stamp released in 1986, and a $1.35 stamp released in 1994. The hats of the Australian Light Horse are decorated with emu feather plumes.

Trademarks of early Australian companies using the emu included Webbenderfer Bros frame mouldings (1891), Mac Robertson Chocolate and Cocoa (1893), Dyason and Son Emu Brand Cordial Sauce (1894), James Allard Pottery Wares (1906), and rope manufacturers G. Kinnear and Sons Pty. Ltd. still use it on some of their products.

There are around six hundred gazetted places in Australia with "emu" in their title, including mountains, lakes, hills, plains, creeks and waterholes. During the 19th and 20th centuries, many Australian companies and household products were named after the bird. In Western Australia, Emu beer has been produced since the early 20th century and the Swan Brewery continues to produce a range of beers branded as "Emu". The quarterly peer-reviewed journal of the Royal Australasian Ornithologists Union, also known as Birds Australia, is entitled Emu: Austral Ornithology.

The comedian Rod Hull featured a wayward emu puppet in his act for many years and the bird returned to the small screen in the hands of his son Toby after the puppeteer's death in 1999. In 2019, American insurance company Liberty Mutual launched an advertising campaign that features LiMu Emu, a CGI-rendered emu.

The animal sanctuary, Alveus Sanctuary, has an emu named Stompy. He was their first animal ambassador, after being hand raised by the Sanctuary's founder. He is known for "giving hugs" to guests at Alveus, including Ludwig, Jaiden Animations, Jack Manifold, Hasan Piker, and Valkryae. In 2025, Alveus rescued a former pet emu, Nolie. She was named by Mr.Beast after helping in her rescue and helping the sanctuary through donations.

Another popular Emu on social media is Emmanuel, a resident of Knuckle Bump Farms in south Florida. Taylor Blake, the farm's owner, since 2013 has recorded video shorts explaining aspects of the farm and is often interrupted as Emmanuel the Emu photobombs her videos, earning constant rebukes; the term "Emmanuel don't do it!" has become popular on social media.

== Status and conservation ==
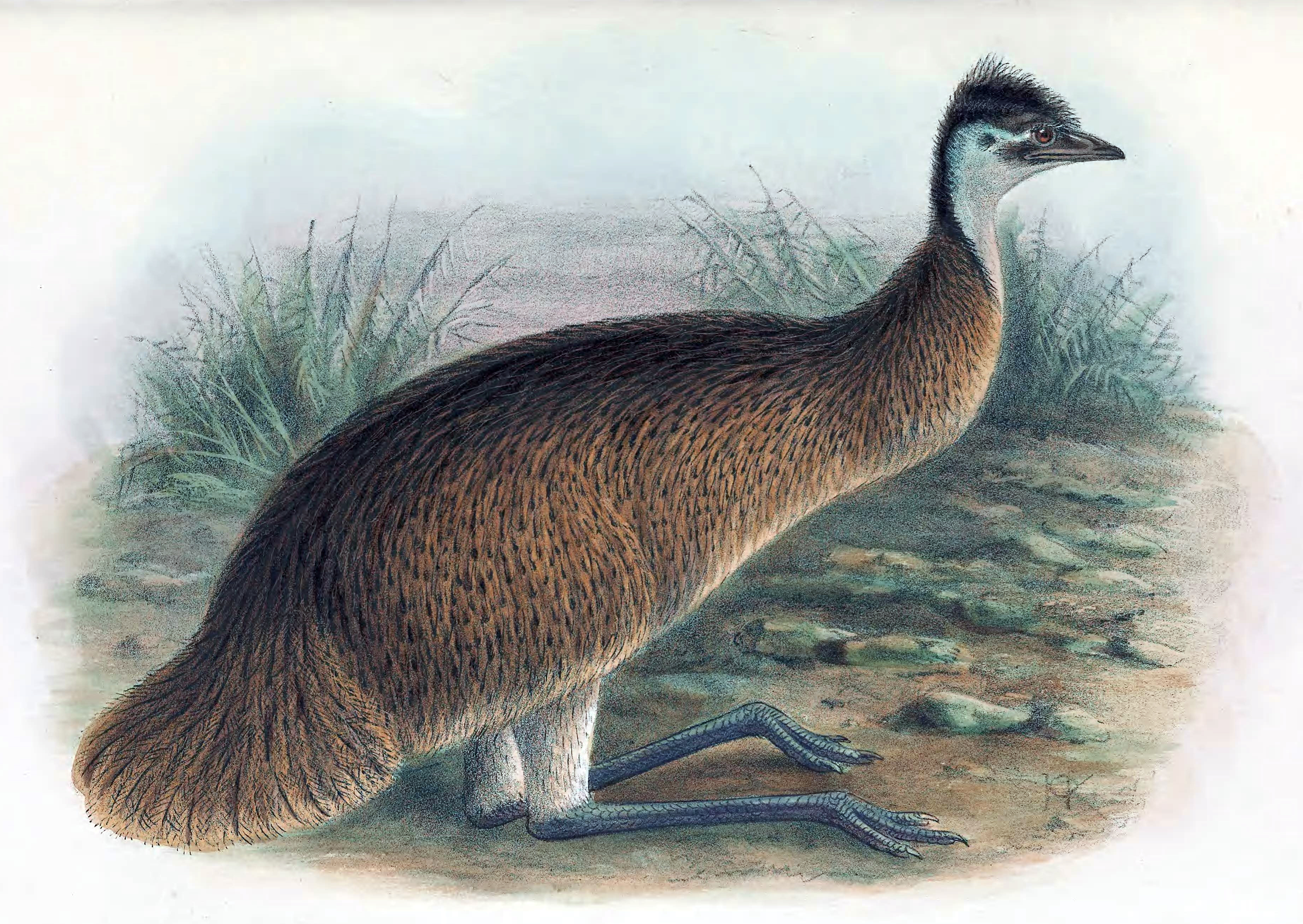
John Gerrard Keulemans's (c. 1910) restoration of the Tasmanian emu, one of three subspecies which were hunted out of existence

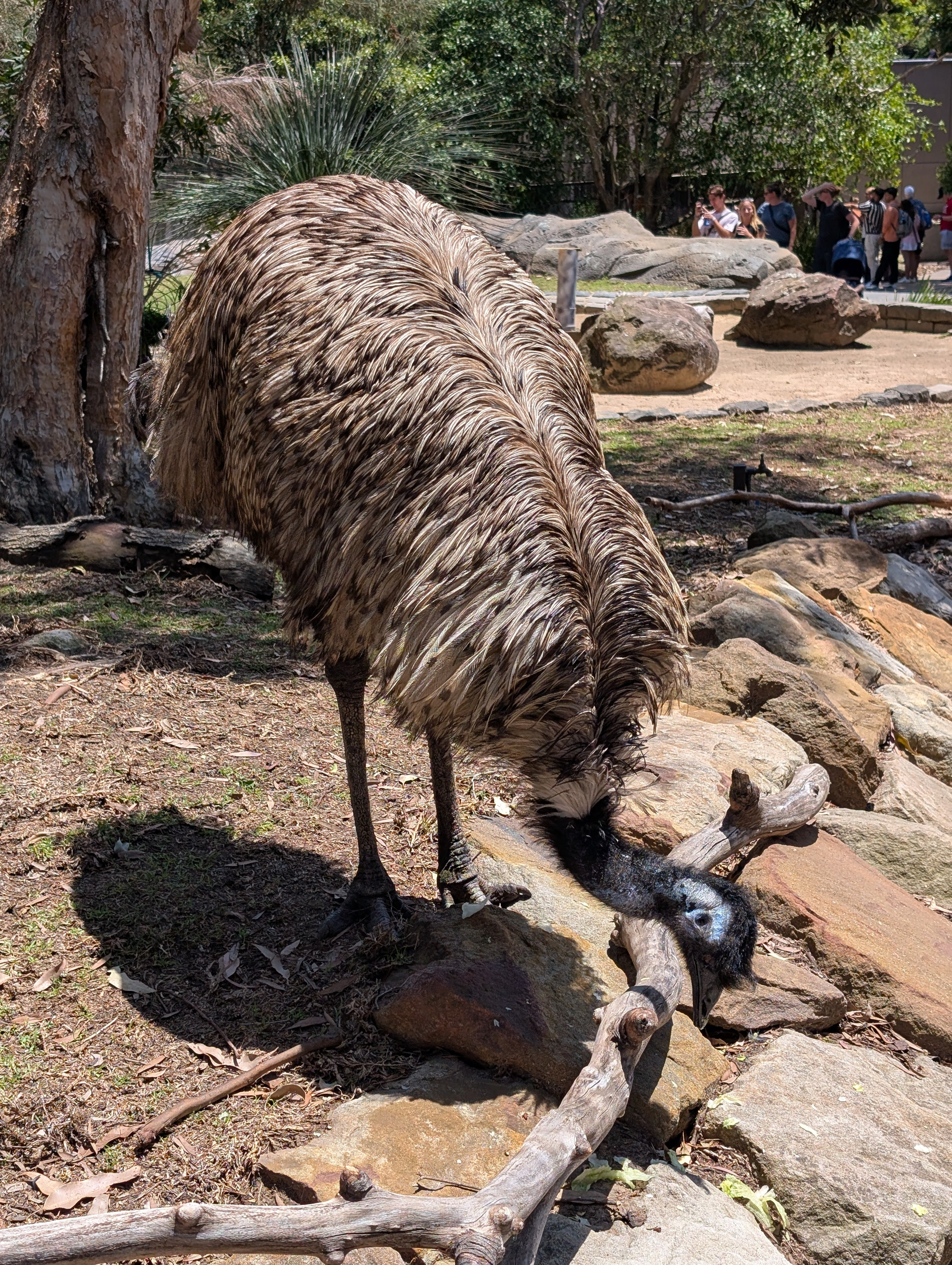
At Taronga Zoo, Sydney, Australia

In John Gould's Handbook to the Birds of Australia, first published in 1865, he lamented the loss of the emu from Tasmania, where it had become rare and has since become extinct; he noted that emus were no longer common in the vicinity of Sydney and proposed that the species be given protected status. In the 1930s, emu killings in Western Australia peaked at 57,000, and culls were also mounted in Queensland during this period due to rampant crop damage. In the 1960s, bounties were still being paid in Western Australia for killing emus, but since then, wild emus have been granted formal protection under the Environment Protection and Biodiversity Conservation Act 1999. Their occurrence range is between 4,240,000 and 6,730,000 km^{2} (1,640,000–2,600,000 sq mi), and a 1992 census suggested that their total population was between 630,000 and 725,000. Their population trend is thought to be stable and the International Union for Conservation of Nature assesses their conservation status as being of least concern. The isolated emu population of the New South Wales North Coast Bioregion and Port Stephens is listed as endangered by the New South Wales Government.

Although the population of emus on mainland Australia is thought to be higher now than it was before European settlement, some local populations are at risk of extinction. The threats faced by emus include the clearing and fragmentation of areas of suitable habitat, deliberate slaughter, collisions with vehicles and predation of the eggs and young.

== See also ==
- Birds of Australia
- Fauna of Australia

== General and cited sources ==
- Eastman, Maxine (1969). The Life of the Emu. Angus and Robertson. ISBN 978-0-207-95120-6.
