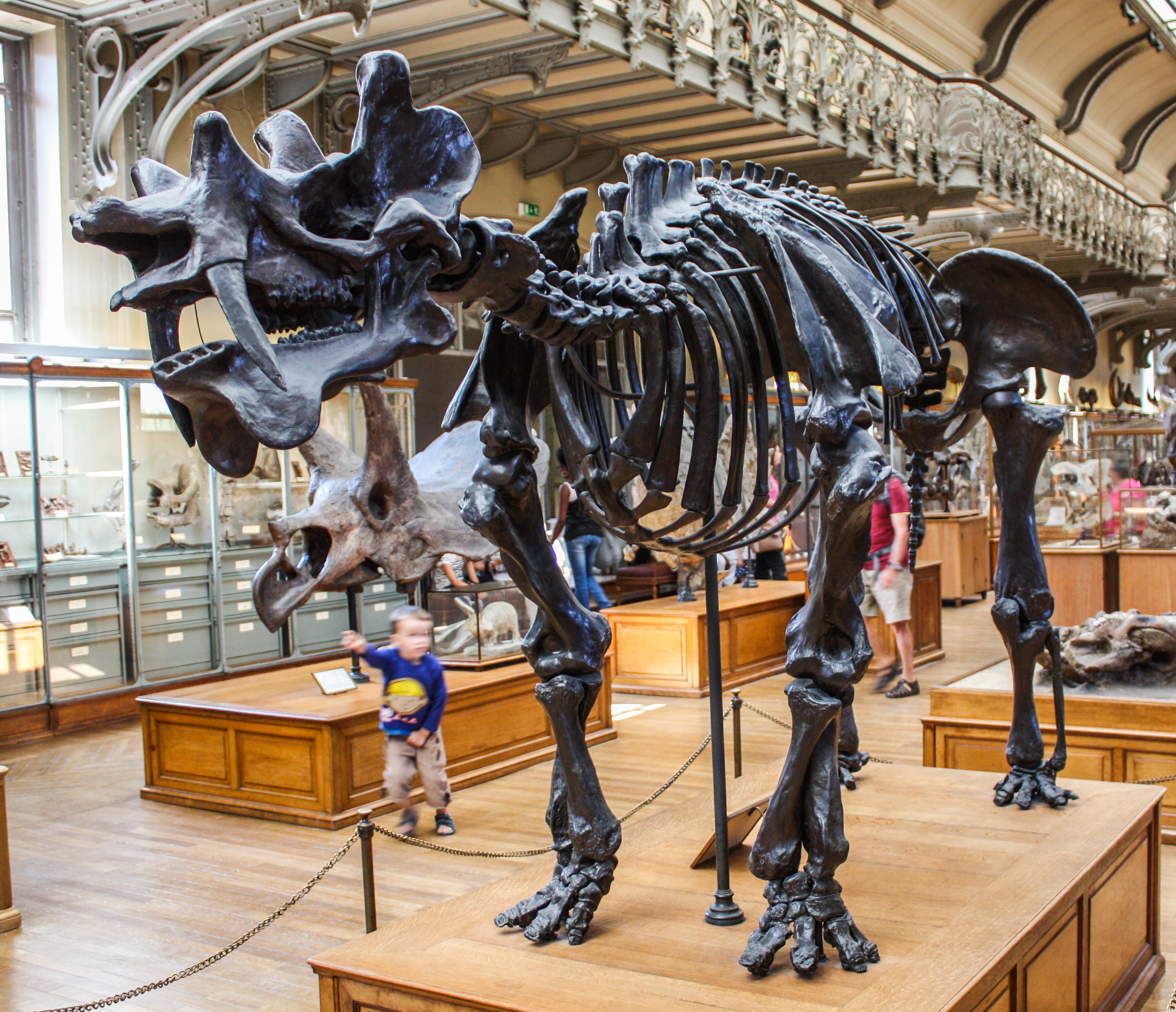
- Cast of the skeleton, French National Museum of Natural History in Paris

Scientific classification
- Kingdom: Animalia
- Phylum: Chordata
- Class: Mammalia
- Order: †Dinocerata
- Family: †Uintatheriidae
- Subfamily: †Uintatheriinae
- Genus: †Uintatherium; Leidy, 1872

Type species
- †Uintatherium anceps (Marsh, 1871) [originally Titanotherium]

Other species
- †U. insperatus Tong & Wang 1981

Synonyms
- Genus synonymy: Uintamastix Leidy, 1872; Loxolophodon Cope, 1872; Tinoceras Marsh, 1872; Dinoceras Marsh, 1872; Ditetrodon Cope, 1885; Octotomus Cope, 1885; Elachoceras Scott, 1886; Synonyms of U. anceps: Titanotherium anceps Marsh, 1871; Uintatherium robustum Leidy, 1872; Uintamastix atrox Leidy, 1872; Loxolophodon furcatus Cope, 1872; Loxolophodon pressicornis Cope, 1872; Tinoceras grande Marsh, 1872; Dinoceras mirabile Marsh, 1872; Dinoceras lacustre Marsh, 1872; Dinoceras lucare Marsh, 1873; Dinoceras laticeps Marsh, 1873; Eobasileus galeatus Cope, 1873; Dinoceras distans Marsh, 1885; Tinoceras pugnax Marsh, 1885; Uintatherium latifrons Marsh, 1885; Tinoceras vagans Marsh, 1885; Uintatherium segne Marsh, 1885; Dinoceras agreste Marsh, 1885; Dinoceras cuneum Marsh, 1885; Dinoceras reflexum Marsh, 1885; Tinoceras affine Marsh, 1885; Tinoceras crassifrons Marsh, 1885; Tinoceras hians Marsh, 1885; Tinoceras jugum Marsh, 1885; Tinoceras (Platoceras) latum Marsh, 1885; Tinoceras (Laoceras) pugnax Marsh, 1885; Elachoceras parvum Scott, 1886; Uintatherium alticeps Scott, 1886

= Uintatherium =

Uintatherium Temporal range: Eocene, 50.5–37 Ma

Extinct genus of mammals

Uintatherium is an extinct genus of dinoceratan mammal that lived during the Eocene epoch. Two species are currently recognized: U. anceps is found in the United States and lived during the early to middle Eocene (50.5–37 million years ago), while U. insperatus is found in China and lived during the middle and late Eocene (48–37 million years ago). The first fossils of Uintatherium were recovered from the Fort Bridger Basin and were initially believed to belong to a new species of brontothere. Several previously recognized species, as well as genera such as Edward Drinker Cope's Loxolophodon and Othniel Charles Marsh's Tinoceras, are now assigned to Uintatherium anceps.

The systematic position of Uintatherium and other dinoceratans has long been debated. Originally, they were assigned to the order Amblypoda, which united various early ungulates from the Paleogene. Amblypoda has since fallen out of use. The most widespread hypothesis is that dinoceratans are related to the South American xenungulates, together forming a mirorder called Uintatheriamorpha. If this is correct, dinoceratans, and thus Uintatherium, would not be ungulates at all. However, it is possible that the traits shared between the two groups evolved independently. Within Dinocerata itself, Uintatherium belongs to the family Uintatheriidae and is one of two members of Uintatheriinae; the other two are Eobasileus and Tetheopsis.

Uintatherium was a large animal, with U. anceps having a shoulder height of 1.5 m (4 ft 11 in) and a body mass of 3,000–4,500 kg (6,600–9,900 lb). The largest Uintatherium skulls known, originally assigned to Loxolophodon, measure 91 cm (36 in) in length. The skull bears a series of bony, skin-covered protrusions, sometimes referred to as horns: one pair on the tip of the snout, one pair above the gap between the canine and cheek teeth, and one pair toward the back of the skull. The skull was similar to that of the other two uintatheriine genera, though broader, and in Eobasileus, the middle pair of protrusions sat further back, directly above the cheek teeth. The canines of Uintatherium were very large and supported by a pair of bony flanges that extended from the lower jaw. They were likely sexually dimorphic, and may have been used in display or for defense. The skeleton of Uintatherium bears a combination of characteristics often associated with proboscideans (elephants and relatives) and rhinocerotids.

Uintatherium evolved during the Paleocene–Eocene thermal maximum, a period which saw some of the highest global temperatures in Earth's history. Most of the North American continent was covered in closed-canopy forests, with the Bridger Formation, one of the localities U. anceps is best known from, consisting of an inland lake surrounded by birch, elm and redwood forests. The depositional environment of the later Uinta Formation also featured open savannahs that resulted from a global cooling and aridification trend in North America. The Chinese species, U. insperatus, lived in an environment of brackish marshes and semi-arid steppe.

== Taxonomy ==
=== Early history ===
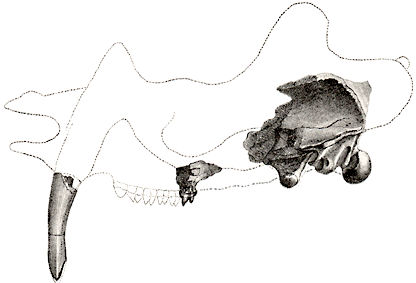
Holotype remains of Uintatherium anceps (originally Titanotherium anceps)

In September 1870, a fragmentary skeleton (catalog number YPM 11030) of Uintatherium was unearthed by US army Lieutenant W. N. Wann in the Bridger Basin of Wyoming. These sediments come from the Eocene-aged Bridger Formation. The skeleton was sent to paleontologist Othniel Charles Marsh, who described it in 1871 as a new species of the brontothere Titanotherium, Titanotherium anceps. The following year, Marsh and Joseph Leidy collected in the Eocene Beds near Fort Bridger while Edward Drinker Cope, Marsh's competitor, excavated in the Washakie Formation. In August 1872, Leidy named Uintatherium robustum based on an incomplete skull and partial mandibles (ANSP 12607). The name Uintatherium refers to the Uinta Mountains, which rise to the south of the Bridger Formation outcrops, while the Ancient Greek θηρίον (thēríon) means 'beast'. Another specimen discovered by Leidy's crews consisting of a canine was named Uintamastix atrox and was thought to have been a saber-toothed carnivore.

Eighteen days after the description of Uintatherium, Cope and Marsh both named new dinoceratan genera from the Uinta Formation, which is located south of the Uinta Mountains. Cope named Loxolophodon in a telegram that Walter Hall Wheeler criticized as "garbled" due to Cope's handwriting; the name was misspelled by an operator as "Lefalophodon". Alongside Loxolophodon, Cope also described another genus of dinoceratan, Eobasileus; the latter remains separate from Uintatherium. Marsh's taxon, meanwhile, was named Tinoceras, and was intended to include the original Titanotherium anceps specimen. Several days later, Marsh erected the genus Dinoceras. Dinoceras and Tinoceras were given additional species by Marsh throughout the 1870s and 1880s, many based on fragmentary material. Several complete skulls were found by Cope's and Marsh's crews. Because of their rivalry, the two would often publish scathing criticisms of each other's work, asserting their respective genera as valid. They named a plethora of species in six genera, which were all later found to be synonymous with Marsh's original taxon, Titanotherium anceps, which is now placed in Leidy's genus, Uintatherium. In 1876, William Henry Flower wrote a letter in Nature wherein he formally suggested to incorporate all of Cope's, Leidy's and Marsh's taxa into Uintatherium, because it was named first and therefore has priority, and because of a lack of convincing evidence for their separation. A major reassessment of the Uintatheriidae came almost a century later, in the form of a 1961 work by Walter Hall Wheeler. In this work, Wheeler redescribed many of the Uintatherium fossils discovered during the 19th century.

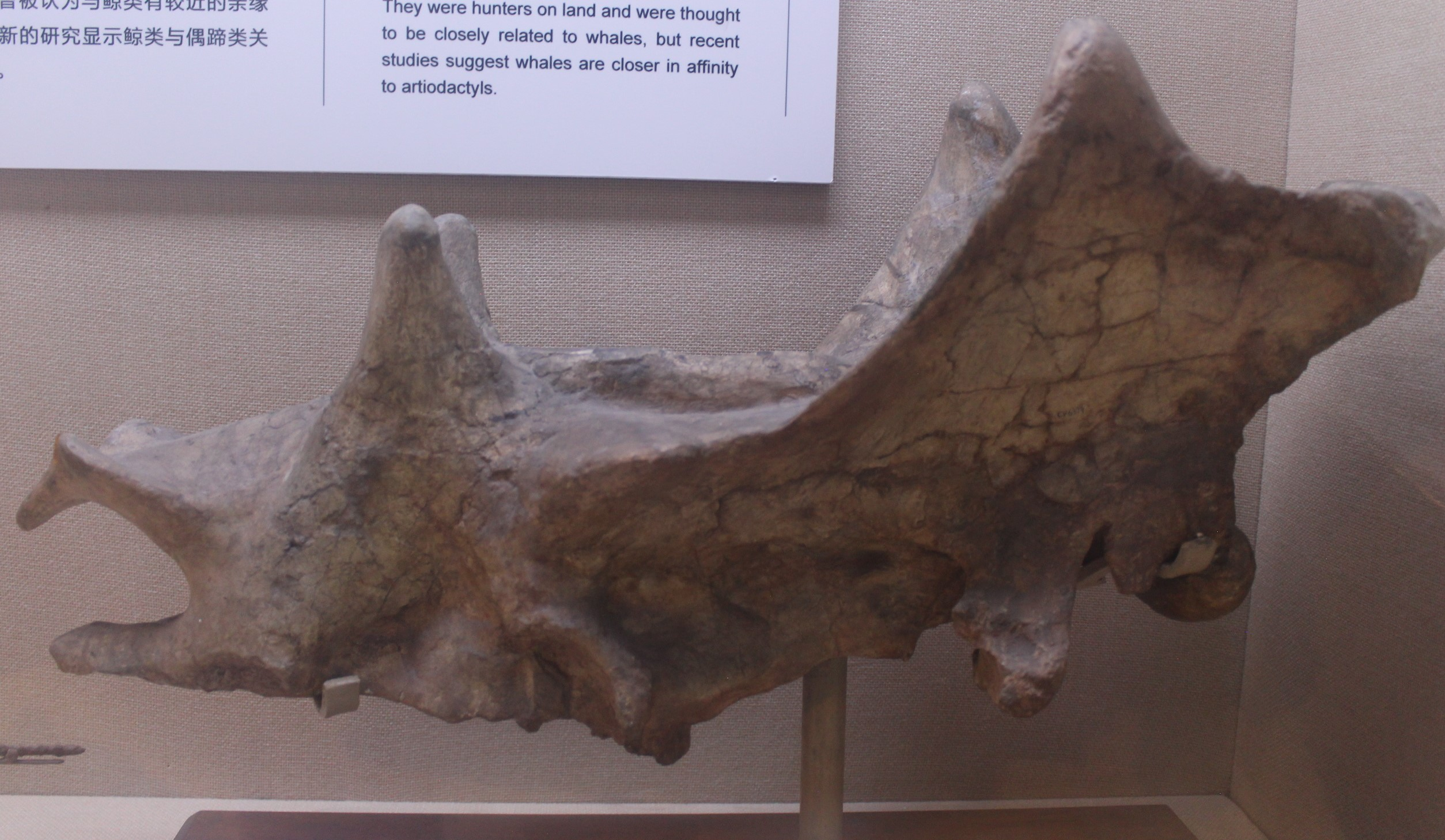
Holotype skull (IVPP V6379) of U. insperatus, Paleozoological Museum of China

In 1962, Zhou Mingzhen and Y. S. Zhou reported teeth (the third upper molar and two upper canines) closely resembling those of Uintatherium from Xintai, Shandong, China. In 1977, Leo Gabounia reported fossils possibly assignable to Uintatherium that had been recovered from Tschaibulak, near Zaisan, Kazakhstan. These were both considered as indeterminate uintatheriids, and have not been assigned to Uintatherium itself, though the Chinese form was labelled as cf. Uintatherium sp. In November 1978, the first unambiguous Asian specimen (IVPP V6379) of Uintatherium was recovered. Wang Daning, Tong Shuisheng and Wang Chuanqiao, working at strata from the lower part of the Lushi Formation (Henan Province, China), recovered a skull. Aside from damage to the nasal bone and zygomatic arches, it was essentially complete. Tong Shuisheng and Wang Chuanqiao wrote that the skull likely belonged to an elderly individual due to the condition of the teeth, which were severely worn. In 1981, the specimen was described and assigned to a new species of Uintatherium, U. insperatus.

=== Classification ===
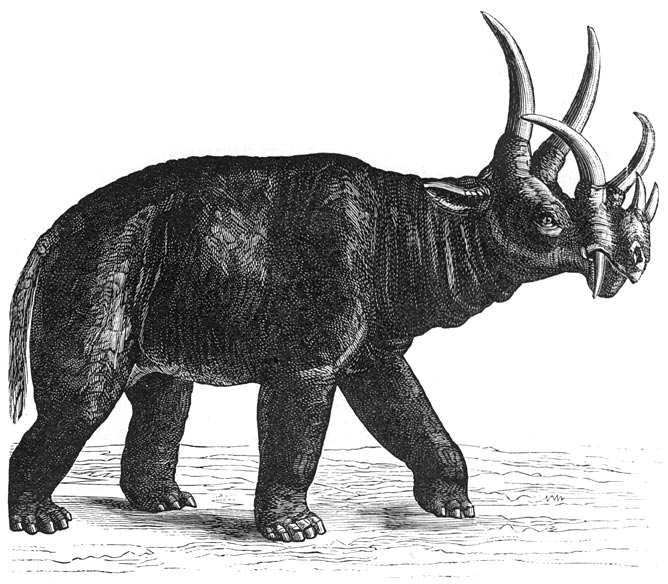
1886 life restoration showing exaggerated horns

Early on, similarities between Uintatherium and proboscideans (elephants and their extinct relatives) were noted by various authors and lead Cope to classify it as a member of that group. While Cope acknowledged Marsh's reasoning for relating it to the Artiodactyla, he nonetheless believed that it stemmed from "unusual sources", and that the "absence of incisor teeth no more relates these animals to the Artiodactyla than it relates the sloth to the same order [...] the presence of paired horns no more constitutes affinity to the ruminants than it does in the case of the 'horned-toad'." It has since been recognized that similarities to proboscideans are likely the product of convergent evolution (evolved independently).

In 1881, Henry Fairfield Osborn assigned Uintatherium to the order Dinocerata. At the time, dinocerates were believed to be part of Amblypoda, a group uniting an assortment of basal (early-diverging) ungulates from the Paleogene, and were sometimes referred to as "dinoceratous amblypods". The group Amblypoda has since fallen out of use and is generally regarded as polyphyletic, meaning that it is an unnatural group consisting of an assortment of distantly related clades. Dinocerata, however, has persisted, though the precise relationships of the order have been the subject of debate.

Relationships with South American native ungulates (SANUs), specifically xenungulates, have been suggested, in part due to perceived similarities to Carodnia. In 1998, Spencer G. Lucas and Robert M. Schoch supported the complete removal of both clades from Ungulata. If dinoceratans and xenungulates are indeed related, they may constitute the mirorder Uintatheriamorpha. Lucas and Schoch, in 1985, noted that the teeth of uintatheriamorphs are similar to those of the "anagalid" Pseudictops. Pseudictops might be related to modern lagomorphs (rabbits, hares and pikas), and would thus, as the same authors commented in 1998, be "[...] tantamount to identifying uintatheres as giant horned bunnies [...]". It has since been asserted that no strong evidence for this relationship exists, and that the similarities observed may have evolved independently, due because of how small and specialized anagalids are and the unlikelihood of them evolving into something like dinoceratans. In 1997, Malcolm McKenna regarded Uintatheriamorpha as a synonym of Dinocerata, though did not elaborate. Bruce J. Shockey and Federico Anaya Daza, in 2003, rejected the use of the term Uintatheriamorpha, considering the supporting data too weak.

In 1988, Donald Prothero and colleagues suggested that dinoceratans and pyrotheres were part of Paenungulata (now consisting solely of hyracoid and tethythere afrotheres), which by their definition also included perissodactyls. Regardless, a phylogenetic analysis published in 2019 by Thomas Halliday and colleagues recovered Uintatherium (the only dinoceratan included in the dataset) as the most basal branch of a clade otherwise consisting of Astraponotus, Carodnia, Parastrapotherium and Pyrotherium, thus placing it within the SANUs.

A cladogram showing the phylogenetic position of Uintatherium, after Halliday and colleagues (2019), is as follows:

- Notoungulata
  - - - Asmithwoodwardia
      - Prolitopterna
    - - Interatherium
      - Simpsonotus
  - - - Uintatherium
    - - Astraponotus
      - - Parastrapotherium
        - - Carodnia
          - Pyrotherium

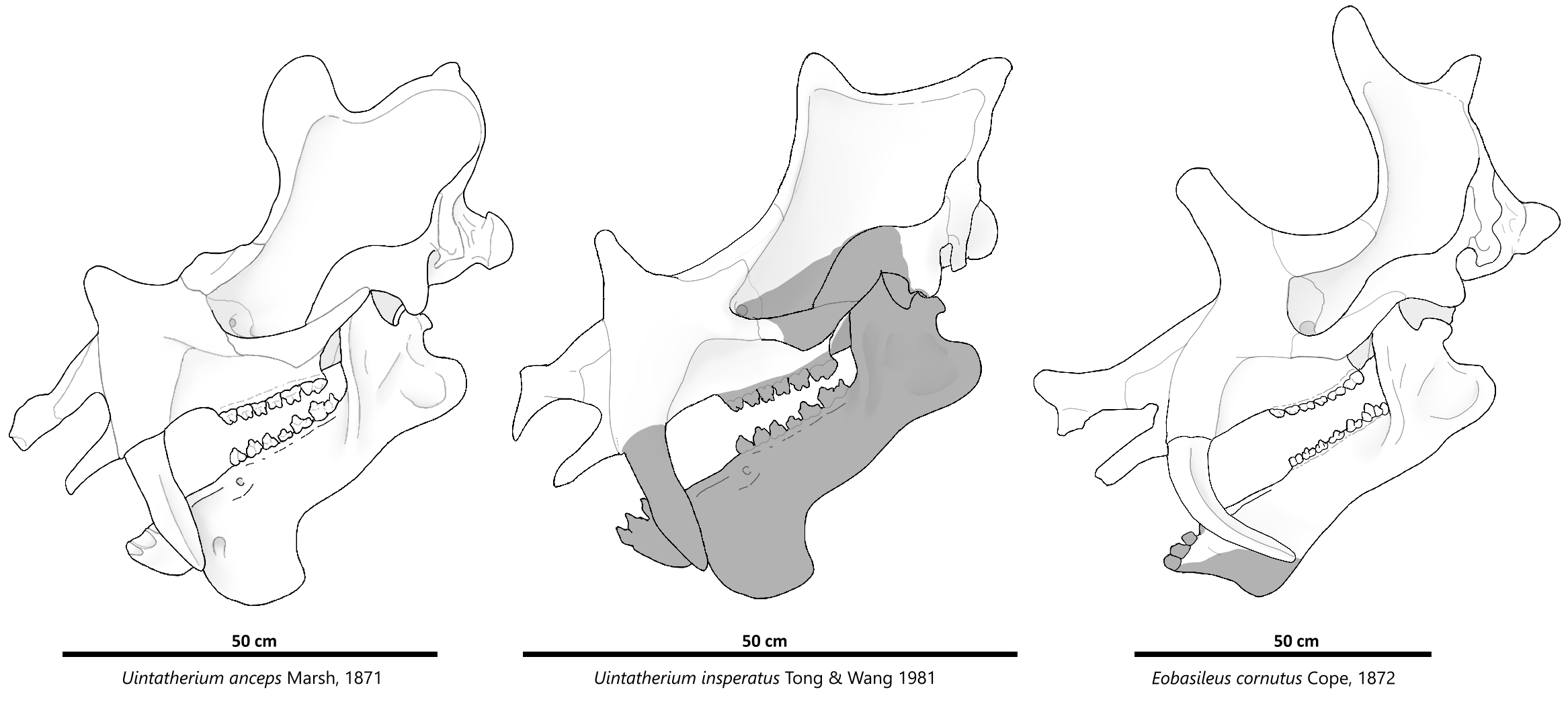
Diagram of the skulls of Eobasileus cornutus, Uintatherium anceps and U. insperatus

Dinocerata has historically been divided into two families, Prodinoceratidae and Uintatheriidae, though some authors use only one family, Uintatheriidae. Assuming two families exist, Uintatheriidae consists of the majority of dinoceratans, and has itself been divided into the subfamilies Gobiatheriinae and Uintatheriinae. Occasionally, Uintatheriinae is divided even further, down to tribe level (Bathyopsini and Uintatheriini). The most basal uintatheriid was Bathyopsis. Walter H. Wheeler suggested in 1961 that the taxa now classed as uintatheriines formed a primarily anagenetic lineage (one in which taxa descended from another without diverging), and that Uintatherium was one of few divergent genera, possibly evolving from Bathyopsis middleswarti (which he believed to be ancestral to both Uintatherium and later dinocerates). Robert M. Schoch and Spencer G. Lucas, in 1985 and 1998, offered a cladistic hypothesis of Dinocerata, in which Uintatherium is the sister taxon to a clade consisting of Eobasileus and Tetheopsis, slightly more derived than Bathyopsis.

The following cladogram depicts the possible interrelationships of dinoceratans, per both of Schoch and Lucas's works:

- Dinocerata
  - Prodinoceras
  - - Gobiatherium
    - - Bathyopsis
      - - Uintatherium
        - - Tetheopsis
          - Eobasileus

In 2002, William D. Turnbull suggested that both Tetheopsis species could be lumped into Eobasileus, and that Uintatheriini might thus consist exclusively of Eobasileus and Uintatherium.

== Description ==
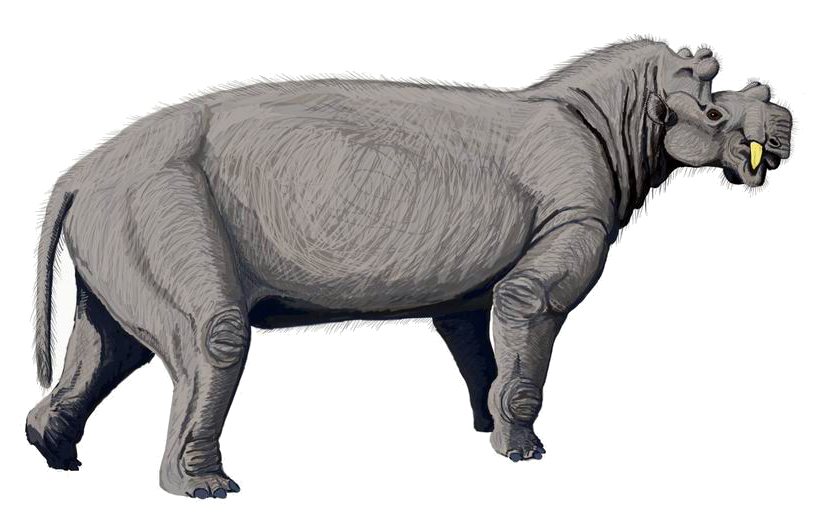
Life restoration of U. anceps

Uintatherium was a large, graviportal animal (one with adaptations for supporting a high body weight), with short, robust and dense limb bones. It was originally believed that there were pronounced differences between sexes, and that males had larger canines, larger flanges on the lower jaws, larger sagittal crests, larger horns, and an overall larger body size, though this may not be the case. As it was a fairly large mammal which lived mostly in warm environments, William Berryman Scott suggested that Uintatherium may have been predominantly hairless, though noted that there is no direct evidence. Its thick, barrel-shaped ribcage has led some to suggest that it may have practised hindgut fermentation, like modern horses and sea cows.

=== Skull ===
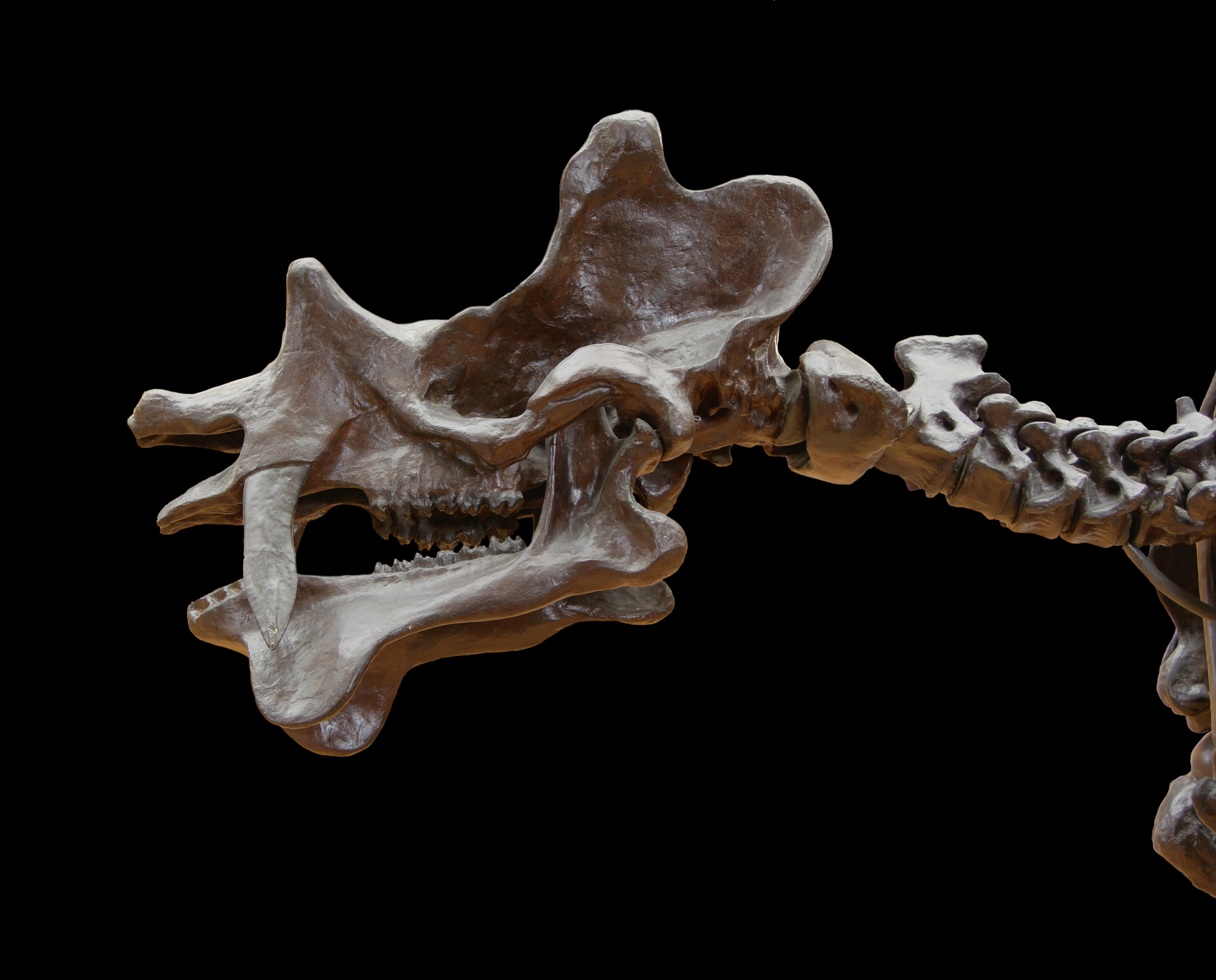
Cast of U. anceps skull, National Museum of Natural History, France

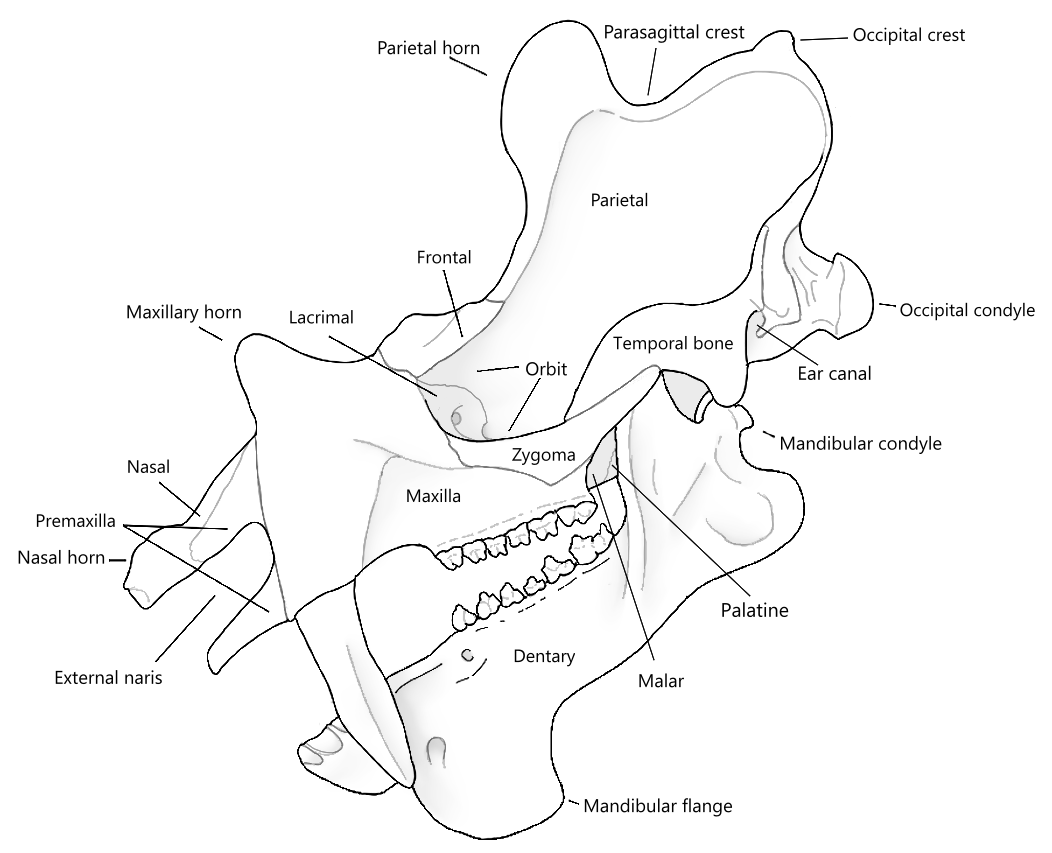
Labelled skull diagram of U. anceps

The skull of Uintatherium is roughly three times longer than it is wide. Most U. anceps skulls range from 69–85 cm (27–33 in) in length, whereas the only known U. insperatus skull measures 61 cm (24 in). Some specimens have skulls which, when measured at the zygomatic arches, are roughly 32 cm (13 in) wide, suggesting a very large skull size. Furthermore, some specimens initially assigned to Loxolophodon have skull lengths of up to 91 cm (36 in), nearly a third larger than most others. The skull of U. anceps can be distinguished from those of other uintatheriins by its broadness, while that of U. insperatus was slenderer. Eobasileus and Tetheopsis have skulls which are relatively longer and slenderer than U. anceps'.

The nasal bones of Uintatherium are very long, comprising roughly half of the total length of the skull. They project far enough anteriorly (forwards) that they completely overhang the external nares. While an elephant-like trunk or proboscis was suggested early on based on supposed affinities to proboscideans, the structure of the nasal passage and olfactory nerves suggest that no such appendage existed. In its place, there may have been a flexible upper lip, similar to that of modern rhinoceros, and a long, muscular tongue. The frontal bones are large, almost as wide as long, though considerably shorter than the nasals. Uintatherium has large zygomatic arches, of which the maxilla comprises the anterior portion, similar to proboscideans. Like other dinoceratans, the skull of Uintatherium lacks a postorbital process. At the back of the skull is a very large occipital crest, extending posteriorly (rearward) further than the occipital condyles. To either side of the occipital crest is a pair of very large parasagittal crests, alternatively known as the posterior crests, or the parietal-occipital crests. The parietal bones of Uintatherium, like its close relatives, are tightly fused, and they bear a distinct transverse ridge which would have provided structural support. The occiput, overhung by a large occipital crest, is rectangular in outline (though was subject to individual variation), and has deep concavities on its posterior surface where powerful neck muscles and ligaments would have attached.

Much like other dinoceratans, Uintatherium's skull is adorned with a series of well-developed outgrowths, sometimes called horns, three pairs in total. The first pair sits at the front of each nasal, and differs in form between specimens: in some, these protrusions are small and deflected upward and outward, while in others, they are larger and more horizontal. In U. insperatus, it is slightly longer and more triangular, and the portion of the nasal anterior to it is slightly longer. The second pair, above the maxillae, sit directly above the diastema (gap) separating the canines and premolars. The last pair, the so-called parietal horns, sit far anterior to (in front of) the occipital bone, on the parasagittal crests. This differs from the related Eobasileus and Tetheopsis, in which the parietal horns are closer to the occipital. Furthermore, in those two genera, the maxillary set of horns sits above the premolars, meaning the portion of the snout anterior to the maxillary horns is fairly long, whereas in Uintatherium, the portion of the snout anterior to the maxillary horns is fairly short. In U. anceps, the maxillary and parietal horns projected outward slightly, while in U. insperatus, they are essentially erect. Despite their description as horns, it is unlikely that any of these outgrowths were cornified (reinforced by keratin), as there is no evidence of the vascularization necessary for a keratinous covering. It is likely that they were covered only by skin. Nevertheless, damage to several Uintatherium horn cores, likely inflicted while the animals were still alive, suggests that they used their horns in agonistic behaviors. Despite suggestions that Uintatherium's horns were sexually dimorphic and were larger in males than in females, a morphometric analysis conducted in 2026 indicates that both sexes had horns of a similar size and shape. Like other animals with extensive cranial ornamentation, Uintatherium's skull was lightened by well-developed sinuses, though not to the same extent.

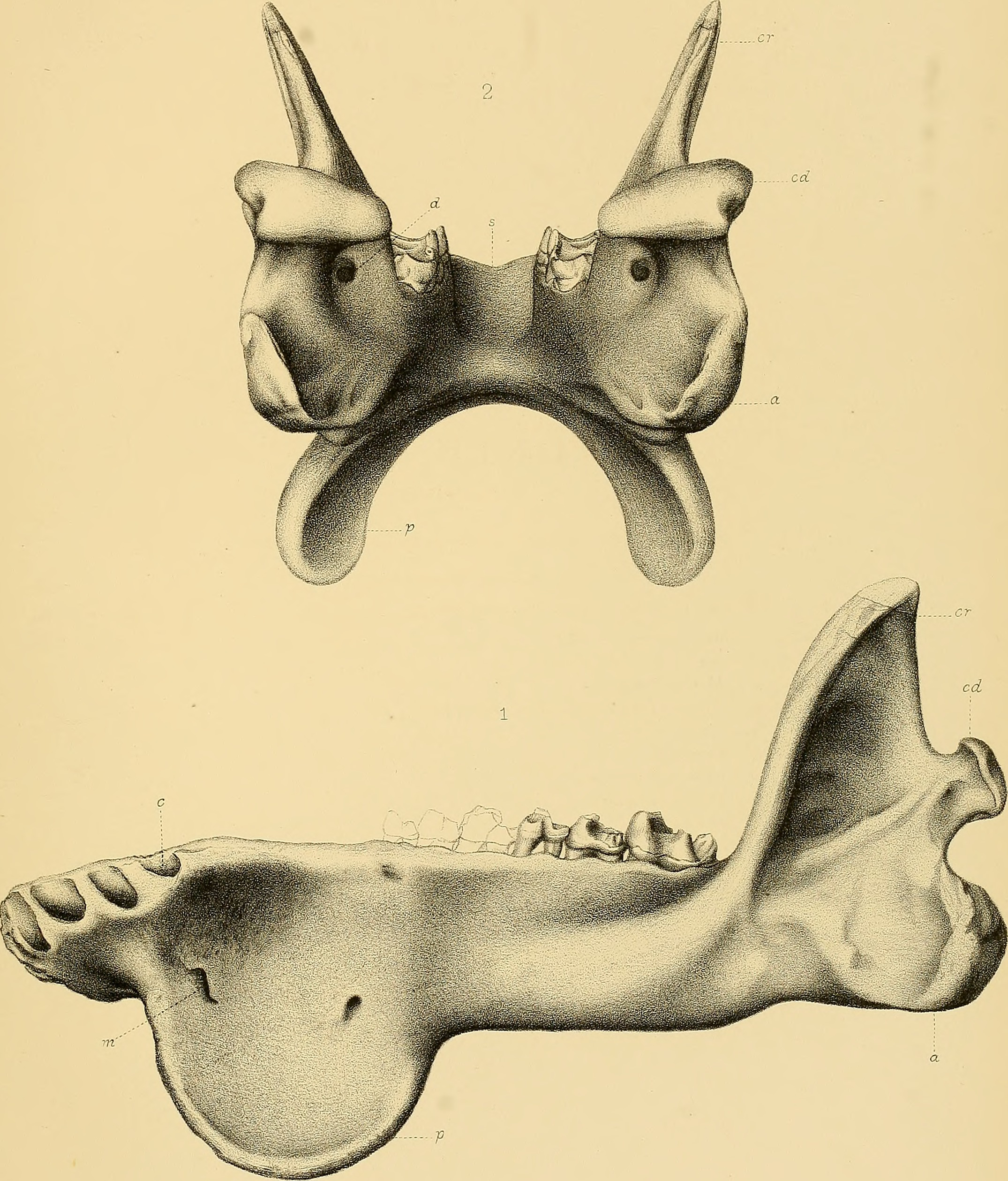
Mandible of Uintatherium, minus the lower incisors

Projecting from the anteroventral (towards the front and bottom) portion of Uintatherium's mandibles (lower jaws) are a pair of large flanges. In most specimens, these would have provided support to the large upper canines, though specimens formerly assigned to Loxolophodon have smaller flanges which do not extend as far. It has been suggested that the observed difference in flange size is the result of sexual dimorphism, with larger-flanged jaws belonging to males. Similar structures are observed in the related Bathyopsis. The mandibles of Uintatherium are otherwise fairly slender. Unlike most other ungulates, the condyles of the jaw joint are deflected posteriorly, likely to accommodate the large upper tusks; without such a modification, the jaws would be unable to fully open. This condition is otherwise only seen in some marsupials and insectivorans. The condyles are small and sit slightly above the level of the cheek teeth. The mandible's coronoid process is large, curves posteriorly, and is pointed dorsally (at the top).

==== Endocast anatomy ====
Uintatherium's brain would have been very small in comparison to its body size. Othniel Charles Marsh stated that it "could apparently have been drawn through the neural canal of all the pre-sacral vertebrae [those preceding the sacrum]". Harry J. Jerison, in 1979, estimated its weight as 290 g (0.64 lb), based on the size of its endocast. The olfactory bulbs, the parts of the brain dedicated to processing scents, were mostly large, though their size was variable. Dorsally, even in adults, the two cerebral hemispheres are only weakly differentiated.

==== Dentition ====
Uintatherium has a dental formula of 0.1.3.33.1.3.3, though one record by Marsh gave a dental formula of 0.1.3.33.1.4.3. The former suggests that each half of the upper jaw had no incisors, one canine, three premolars and three molars, whereas the lower jaw had three incisors, one canine, three premolars and three molars in each half, resulting in 34 teeth in total. Marsh's formula includes four lower premolars instead of three, and thus 36 teeth in total. Analysis of its tooth enamel using prismatic light guides has demonstrated the presence of oblique "zigzag" lines, similar to those of the pantodont Coryphodon, as well, for example, entelodontids and hyenas; most modern eutherian mammals have enamel reinforced by Hunter-Schrerger bands instead.

Uintatheriids generally lack upper incisors, and the same is true of Uintatherium. Instead of upper incisors, there was probably a firm elastic pad similar to that of ruminants. The lower incisors are bilobate, meaning that their crowns are split into two distinctive cusps. The lower canines were somewhat incisiform, meaning that they resemble conventional incisors, while the upper canines are large and have been compared to sabres. Eobasileus and Tetheopsis have similar canines. The size of the canines, as with their supporting flanges, appears to have been mildly sexually dimorphic, and they may have served a display function or been used in defense. George Gaylord Simpson suggested in 1941 that Uintatherium's canines might have been employed in aggressive downward stabs. The reduction or loss of the upper incisors, and the retention and growth of the upper canines, is a trend which has been observed throughout dinoceratans.

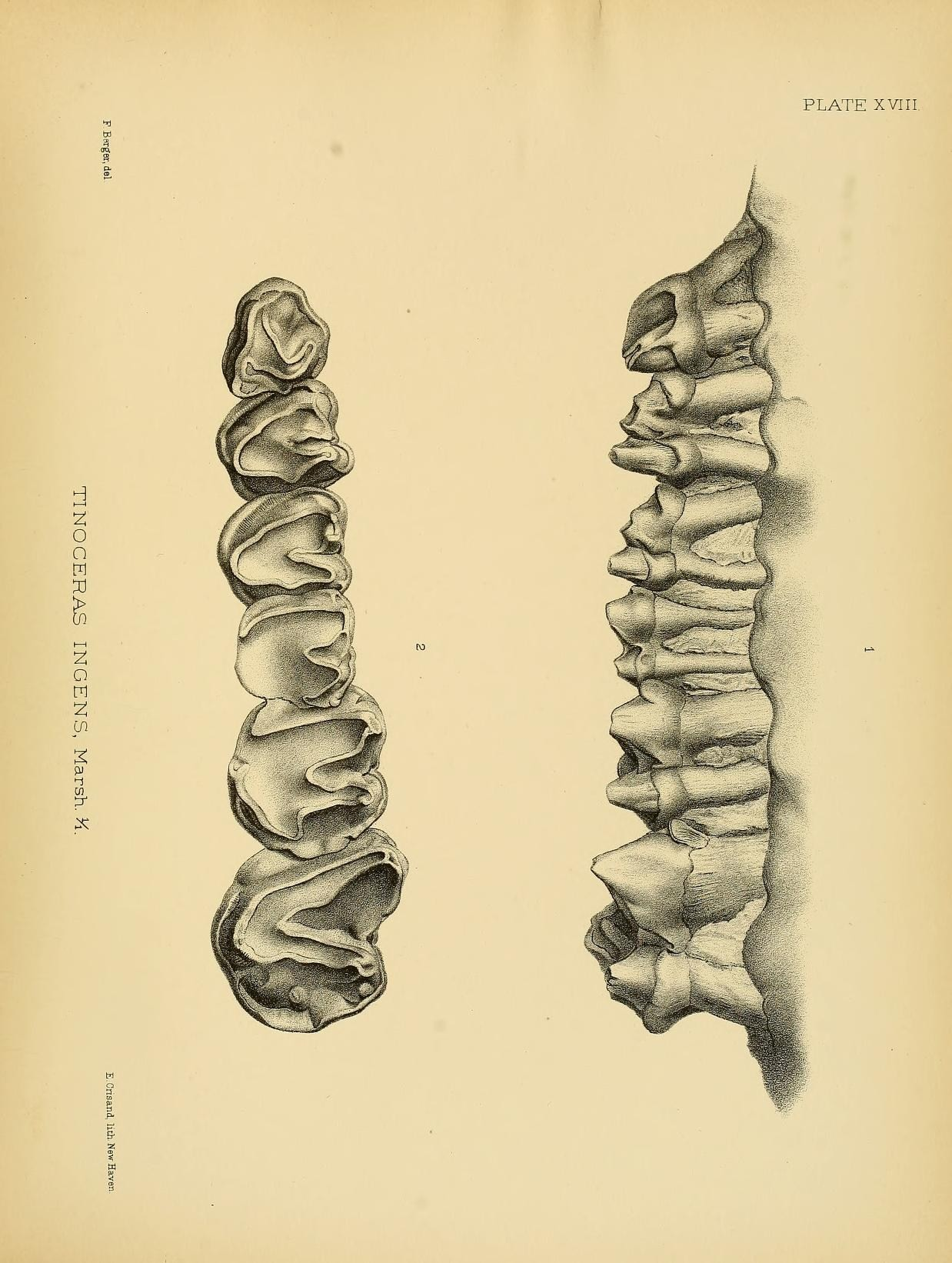
Upper cheek teeth of Uintatherium, from below (left) and left lateral view (right)

Between the canines and cheek teeth, there is a large gap, the diastema. Behind the diastema on both upper and lower jaws are three premolars and three molars, all of which are fairly small and brachyodont, meaning they have short crowns and well-developed roots. Horace Elmer Wood, in 1923, described them as "inadequate-appearing". The first upper premolar was lost, with only the occasional preservation of the alveolus (tooth socket); reduced first premolars, on both upper and lower jaws, are a diagnostic trait of dinoceratans. The first lower premolar is apparently absent in some specimens, while absent in others, i.e. those assigned to "Dinoceras". The third lower molar is very short, with reduced ectoconid and hypoconulid crests. The paraconids and paracristids of all teeth from the third upper premolar to the second upper molar are greatly reduced. Uintatherium's dentition is intermediate between that of Bathyopsis and Eobasileus: the former taxon has smaller upper canines, less incisiform lower canines, and less strongly bilophodont cheek teeth than Uintatherium, while the latter has more extreme developments of those traits. This is part of the reason why an evolutionary sequence between the three genera has been proposed.

=== Vertebral column ===
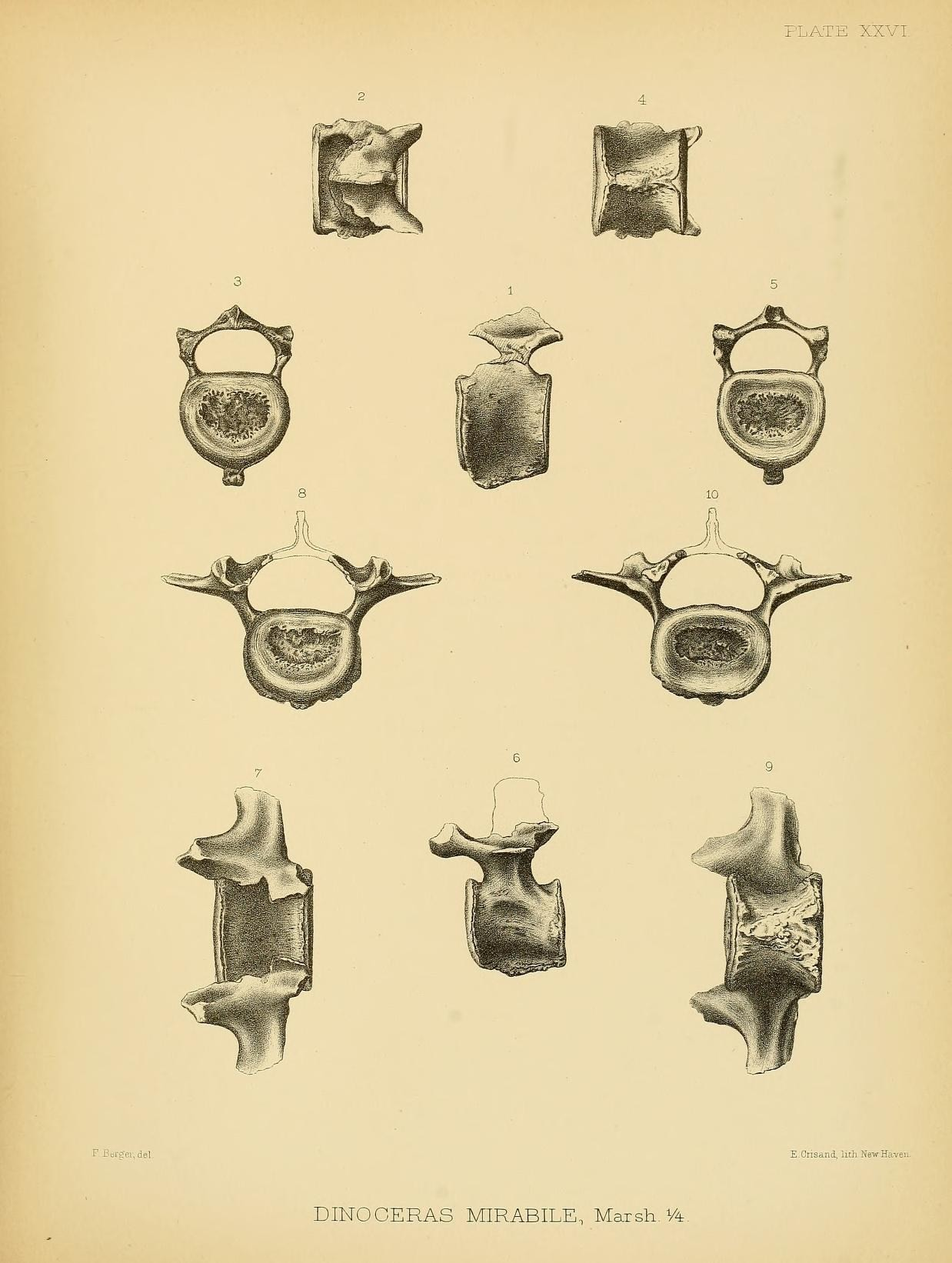
Multi-angle rendition of the first (1–5) and last (6–10) lumbar vertebrae of Uintatherium

Uintatheriines are characterized by their heavy and robust skeletons, often historically compared to proboscideans. Uintatherium's neck was similar but much longer than that of Eobasileus. The first two cervical (neck) vertebrae, the atlas and axis, are robust. The rest of the cervical series is fairly elongated. The vertebral centra, the main bodies, are taller than they are long, and wider than they are tall. All of the thoracic (upper back) and lumbar (lower back) vertebrae are slightly opisthocoelous, meaning that their centra are convex anteriorly and concave posteriorly. The first thoracic vertebra has a fairly small neural spine and short transverse processes. Further back in the thoracic column, the vertebrae become much larger, and possess correspondingly larger neural spines. The lumbar vertebrae have wedge-shaped centra and weak, laterally flattened neural spines, with thin transverse processes. Four fused vertebrae are present in the sacrum of the hip region, and their centra decrease in size from front to back. Uintatherium's caudal (tail) vertebrae have long, narrow centra that also decrease in size the further back they are in the tail. They are quite broad, though have slender neural spines relative to modern groups like rhinocerotids. The ribs of Uintatherium have been compared to those of proboscideans, while the sternum more closely resembles that of artiodactyls in that its constituent bones are more horizontal.

=== Limbs ===
==== Front limbs ====
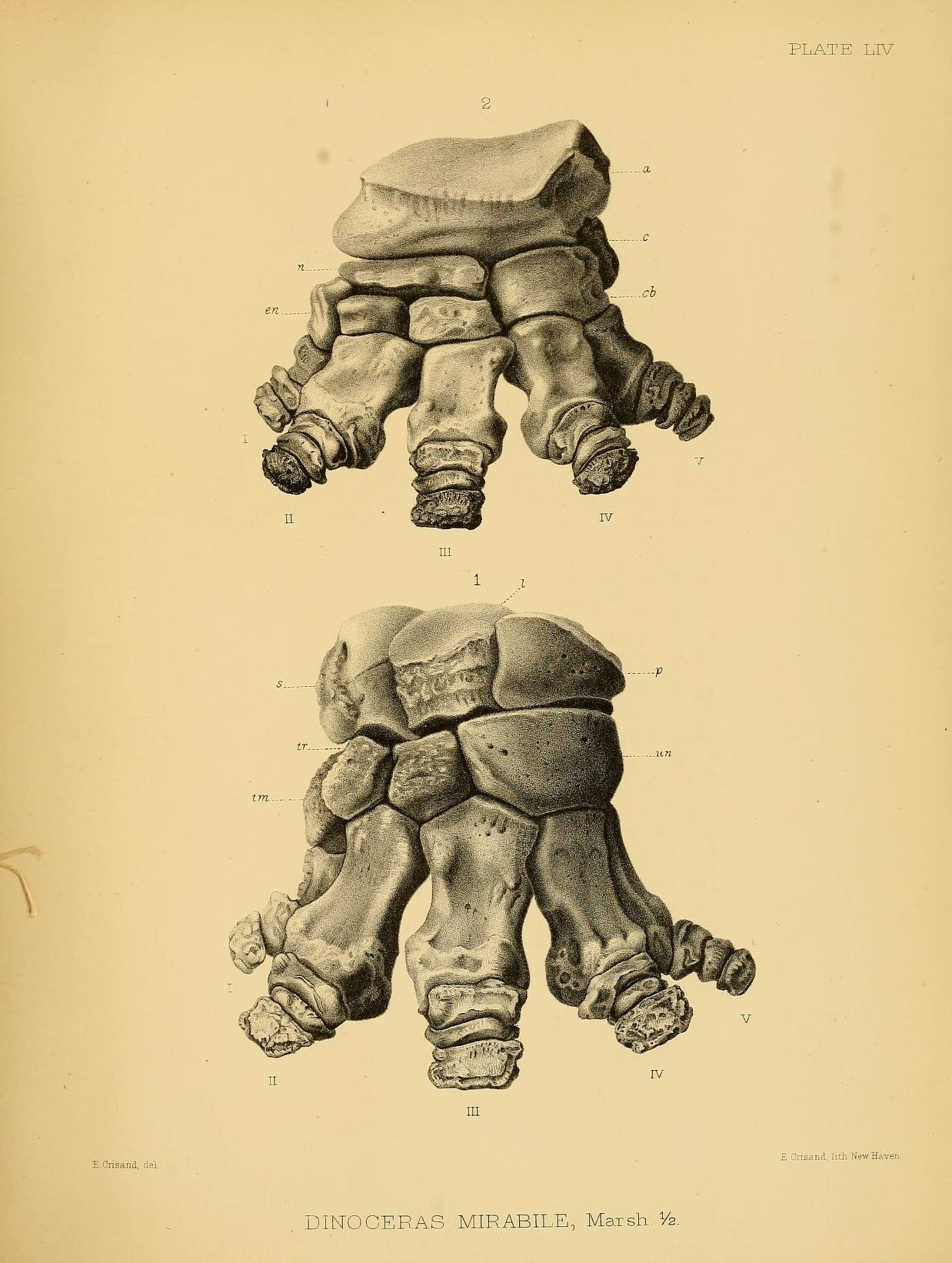
Comparison between the forefoot (below) and hindfoot (above) of Uintatherium

The scapula (shoulder blade) of Uintatherium resembles that of proboscideans, though is less developed above the glenoid fossa. The humerus (upper arm bone) is fairly short and massively built. Its great tuberosity is compressed, and does not extend above the head of the humerus. The lower portion of the humerus resembles that of rhinocerotids. The radius and ulna are essentially equal in size. Uintatherium's forelimbs each bear five digits. There are eight carpal (wrist) bones, which interlock, similar to perissodactyls. Uintatherium's scaphoid bone is somewhat like elephants, though is shorter and stouter, and has a rounded upper end. The smallest bone of the carpus is the trapezoid. Unlike elephants and other proboscideans, the unciform bone articulates with both the cuneiform and lunar bones. The phalanges (digit bones) are short, and grow increasingly rugose towards the toe tips. The manus anatomy of Uintatherium somewhat resembles that of Coryphodon. In life, it is likely that all four of Uintatherium's appendages bore fleshy pads like those of elephants, and were somewhat columnar in shape.

==== Hind limbs ====
Uintatherium's pelvis (hip) is very large, with a sub-oval ilium. Its width suggests that it supported a greatly enlarged hindgut. The femur (thighbone) is fairly short, lacked a pit to accommodate the round ligament, and had a greater trochanter which was flat and recurved. The lower end of the femur was laterally flattened. Like in other dinoceratans, the femur lacked a third trochanter. While standing, Uintatherium would have held its hind legs essentially straight, as in elephants and humans. The patella (kneecap) is oval-shaped. The fibula is slender, with prominent articular faces for the elements of the ankles (the tarsals). The anterior portion of the astragalus, or talus, has articular faces for both the cuboid and navicular bones, as in perissodactyls. Uintatherium's pes (hind foot) has four well-developed digits, and a fifth which is smaller and less well developed. Though smaller, the pedal phalanges were otherwise similar to the manus. Uintatherium's hind feet were digitigrade, meaning that only the toes contacted the ground, while the rear part of the foot was elevated.

=== Size ===
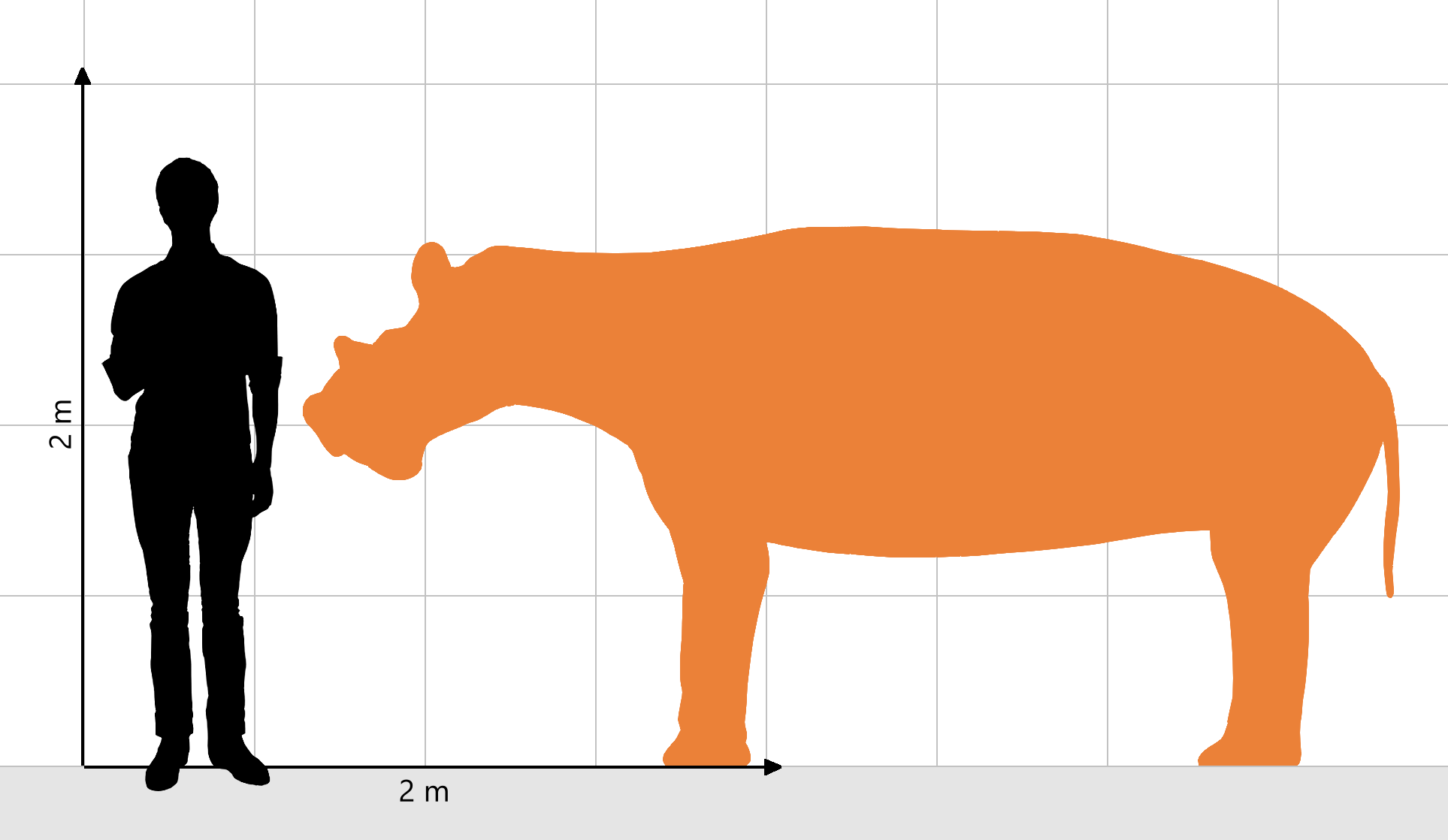
Size diagram of Uintatherium anceps and a human

Marsh estimated that Uintatherium anceps stood roughly four-fifths the height of Eobasileus, (Note: Eobasileus was referred to as Tinoceras ingens, whereas Uintatherium was referred to as Dinoceras mirabile, in that work.) so about 1.5 m (4 ft 11 in) at the shoulder. In 1979, Harry J. Jerison provided a body length estimate of 300 cm (120 in), while in 2002, an average body length of 328.8 cm (129.4 in), based on three mounted specimens, was provided by William D. Turnbull. Many different body mass estimates have been proposed for the genus over the decades. In a 1963 work, Harry J. Jerison provided various mass estimates for multiple of Paleogene mammal taxa. Two of his Uintatherium estimates average 1,400 kg (3,100 lb), while the use of scale models resulted in a range of 1,300–2,300 kg (2,900–5,100 lb). John Damuth, using head–body length and data from teeth, recovered a considerably smaller body mass of 690–867 kg (1,521–1,911 lb). Using Jerison's methods and additional data provided by Damuth, a 2002 paper by Turnbull gave 1,450 kg (3,200 lb). He recovered larger masses in other analyses, but believed that these were overestimates due to the methodologies applied. Four years prior, Lucas and schoch had provided even larger estimates of 3,000–4,500 kg (6,600–9,900 lb) for U. anceps. The size of U. insperatus is not certain, though the holotype skull was smaller than U. anceps.

== Paleoecology ==
=== Diet and lifestyle ===
Like other uintatheriids, the cheek teeth of Uintatherium were bilophodont (two-ridged). Animals with this cheek tooth morphology are often browsers, feeding on leaves, shoots and twigs of relatively high-growing plants. It has therefore been suggested that Uintatherium adopted a similar lifestyle. However, in 2002, Turnbull suggested that it, and other late-stage dinoceratans, were more ecologically analogous to hippopotamuses, citing traits such as pachyostosis, short legs, and a barrel-shaped ribcage as supporting evidence. As C_{4} grasses, on which hippopotamuses often feed, became widespread only fairly recently, and dinoceratan teeth were not suited for grazing, he noted that they likely fed quite differently to hippopotamuses. Whereas most modern ungulates ferment plant matter in their foregut, Turnbull suggested based on pelvic anatomy that Uintatherium was instead a hindgut fermenter, similar to proboscideans and some perissodactyls. He further proposed that late-stage dinoceratans had digestive systems similar to those of sea cows. If this model is accurate, the processing of food would have occurred primarily in the hindgut, reducing demands on the cheek teeth and resulting in the "inadequate appearance" observed by Wood. Hindgut fermentation in dinoceratans was also suggested in 1989 by Christine M. Janis.

=== Paleoenvironment ===
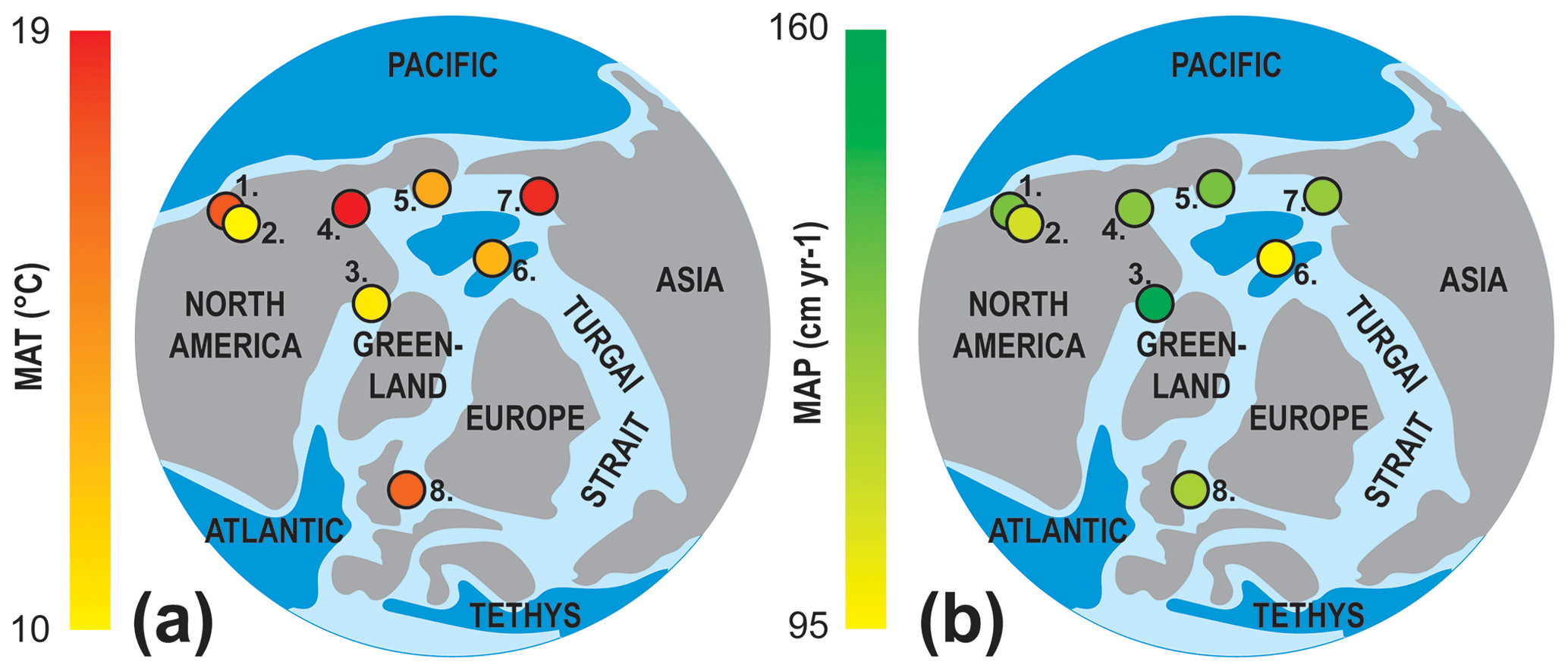
Map of the Northern Hemisphere during the Eocene showing mean annual temperature and precipitation of various locations

Uintatherium evolved during a period in Earth's climatic history called the Paleocene–Eocene thermal maximum. This period saw some of the highest average temperatures in Earth's history with temperatures in Colorado (where Uintatherium fossils have been found) reaching an annual average of 20 °C (68 °F)—much higher than today where the mean annual temperature in Colorado is only around 6 °C (43 °F). Although global average temperatures declined throughout the Eocene, the average temperatures in North America remained relatively constant during the first half of the period, and only cooled slightly towards the end of the Eocene. Even though temperatures remained relatively constant, the uplifting of the Rocky Mountains and their associated volcanism led to considerable drying in the North American interior. The arid scrublands which characterize the western United States today (as exemplified by Arizona, Nevada and New Mexico) began to emerge during this period. This transition, at least directly around the Rocky Mountains, appears to have begun around 42 million years ago.

When Uintatherium first appeared in North America, most of the continent was covered in closed-canopy forests. This environment is exemplified by the Bridger Formation, which consisted of inland lakes surrounded by dense forests. This is inferred by the abundance of plant fossils and the presence of a great diversity of primate fossils, which are predominantly arboreal. Fossils of redwoods, elms and birch trees are known from throughout North America during this period, suggesting that the amount of precipitation did not vary considerably across latitudes. Even organisms more typically adapted to low-latitude environments, such as palm trees and crocodylians, are found as far north as Alaska and Ellesmere Island, exemplifying the extreme climatic conditions of the early and middle Eocene.

By the time of the Uinta Formation, the landscape had changed considerably. The large lakes emblematic of the earlier Eocene had shrunk, and the majority of deposition was the product of low-volume streams. Insectivorous and frugivorous mammals (especially primates) declined in diversity alongside a rise of folivorous artiodactyls, which is interpreted as reflecting an increase in more open habitats resulting from a gradual decline in tree cover. Considerable forests existed, likely alongside the numerous waterways, but these were probably interspersed by open savannah environments. This trend towards aridification was caused by a general decrease in precipitation in North America while average annual temperatures remained high. It would not be until the later parts of the Eocene that the global cooling began to affect North American ecosystems, by which point, Uintatherium was already extinct.

U. insparatus appeared in Asia during the middle part of the Eocene. Its fossils are known from the Lushi Basin in China, which consisted of large, deep lakes that preserve fossils of bivalves and gastropods. These lakes were surrounded by forests and swamps and were interspersed by semi-arid steppe. Intermittent flooding at the time also produced brackish lakes and swamps. The inland lakes varied in size over the course of the middle Eocene before eventually disappearing completely and being replaced by rivers and floodplains.

=== Contemporary fauna ===
==== North America ====
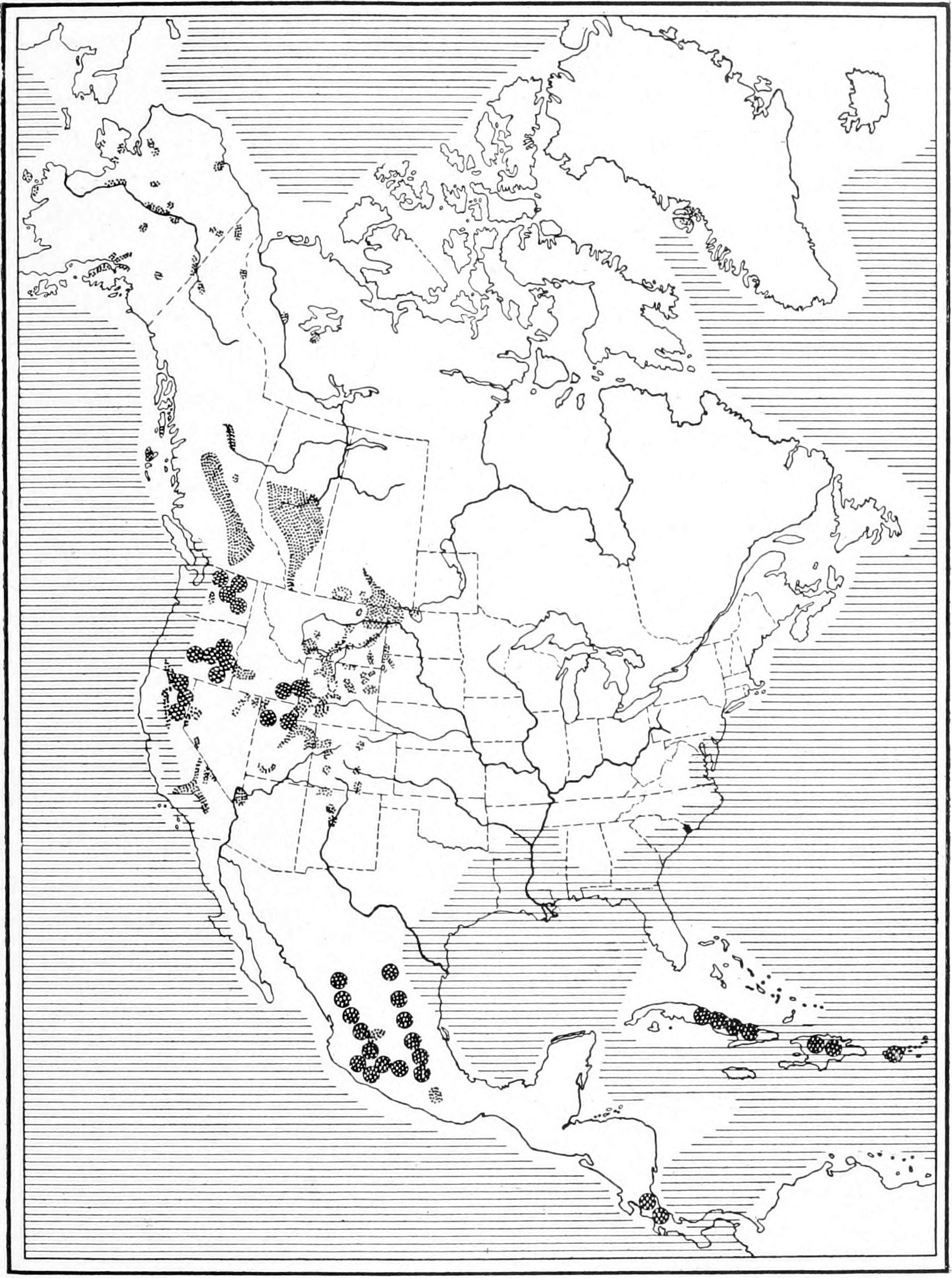
A map of North America during the Eocene, with modern borders shown

Uintatherium anceps is known from the Bridger, Uinta and Washakie formations, from the Bridgerian and Uintan North American land mammal ages. This corresponds to the interval between 50.5 and 39.7 million years ago—a span of just over 10 million years within the Eocene. The oldest remains confidently assigned to this species are from the faunal zone "BR3" of the Bridger Formation, which is at the end of the Bridgerian land mammal age.

In the Bridger Formation, U. anceps coexisted with a variety of primitive ungulates including helohyids, homacodontids, brontotheriids, amynodontids and hyopsodontids. The environment was also host to some of the ancestors of modern perissodactyl groups including Hyrachyus (a primitive relative of rhinos), Helaletes (an early relative of tapirs) and several species of Orohippus (a primitive horse). North America at the time also had a diverse assemblage of early primates including Microsyops, Notharctus, Smilodectes and the members of Omomyidae (relatives of modern tarsiers). Mammalian predators of the region included mesonychids like Mesonyx and Harpagolestes, hyaenodontids like Limnocyon and Sinopa, oxyaenids like Patriofelis and Machaeroides, and early carnivoran relatives like Miacis and Vulpavus. A variety of more enigmatic mammal forms were also present including members of Tillodontia, Stylinodontidae and Pantolestidae and the small insectivorous Apatemys and Metacheiromys. Primitive sciuromorph rodents, leptictids and eulypotyphlans coexisted with the metatherians Herpetotherium and Peradectes.

Reptiles were also abundant in this environment. Fossils from turtles including soft-shelled turtles, tortoises, terrapins and baenids lived alongside anguids, varanids, teiids and boids as well as crocodilians like Boverisuchus and Borealosuchus. Remains of primitive owls and cranes have also been found.

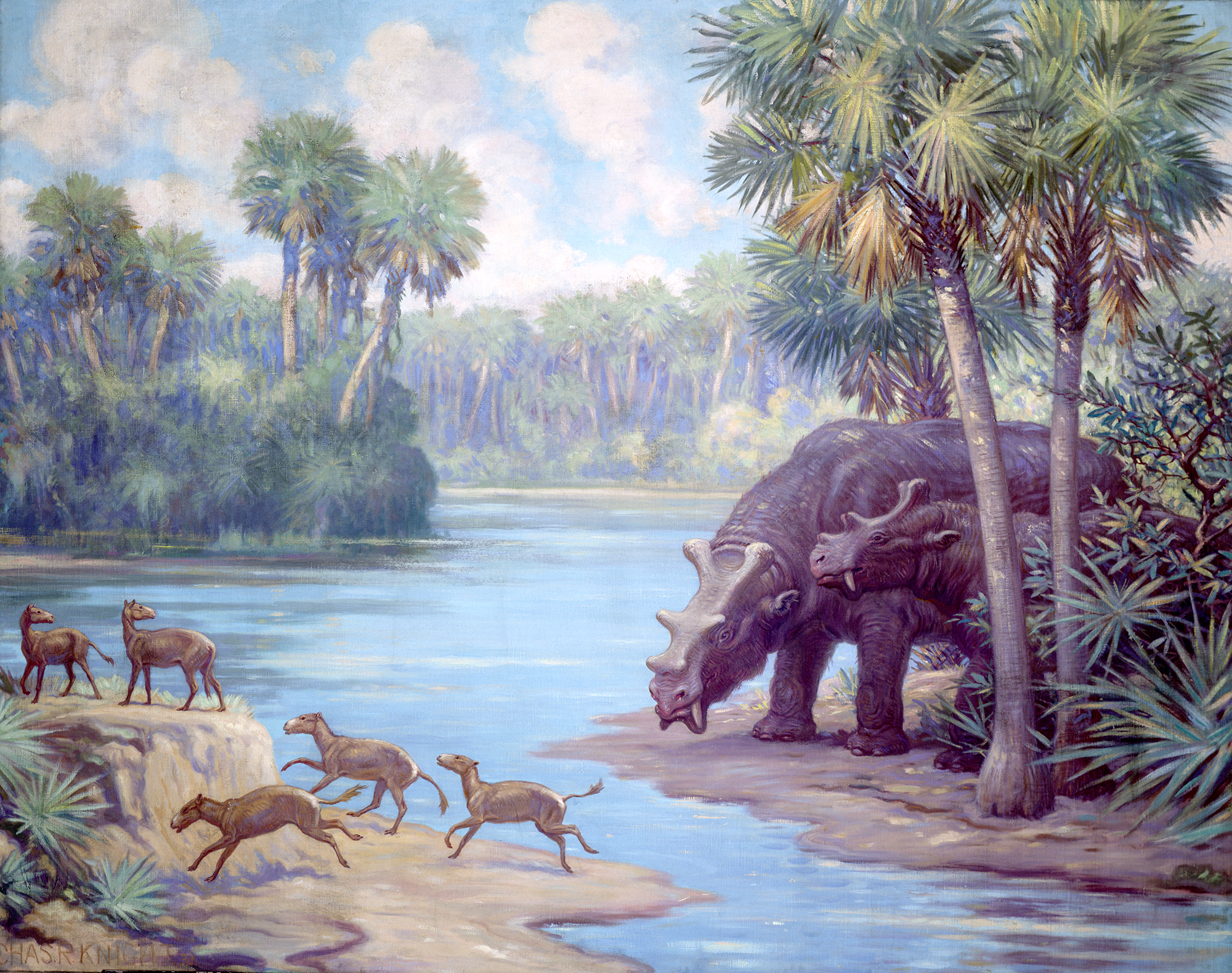
A pair of Uintatherium depicted with the contemporary equid Orohippus

In the transition from the Bridgerian to the Uintan, several of these animals became extinct and new forms emerged. The oxyaenids and phenacodontids disappeared during this transition and new groups like the oromerycids and the earliest chalicotheres (the eomoropids). This transition is followed by the appearance of several medium and large ungulate genera including Protylopus, Amynodon and Eobasileus. This faunal subinterval is represented by the Devil's Graveyard Formation and has been argued to be a distinct land mammal sub-age (the "Shoshonian" or "UI1b biochronological zone"), although this is not universally accepted. This transition also saw a marked decline in primate diversity in North America, which would continue throughout the Eocene until primates eventually became extinct in North America.

The middle-Uintan land mammal age (sometimes called "UI2" biochronological zone) is the most recent interval from which fossils of U. anceps are known. This corresponds to the eponymous Uinta Formation. This interval saw the diversification of brontotheres, helohyids and rhinocerotoids as well as the emergence of the first protoceratids, agriochoerids and camelids. It also saw the extinction of North American cimolestans and leptictids as well as most of the remaining North American primates, with only the omomyids remaining extant. Primitive carnivoramorphs like Miocyon also emerged. The end of this interval saw the final extinction of Uintatherium in North America alongside other long-lived genera such as Mesonyx and Hyrachyus.

==== Asia ====
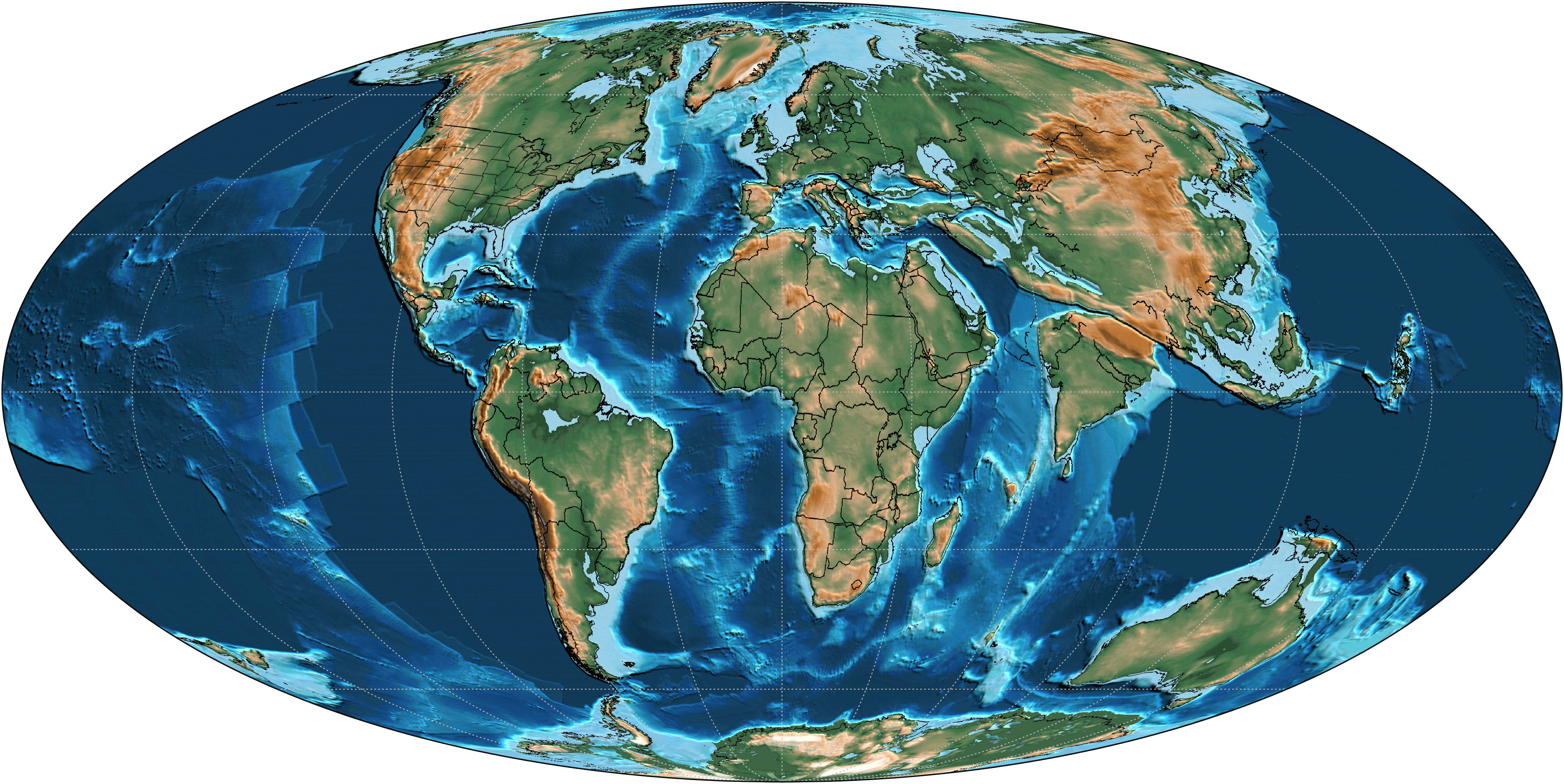
A map of the world during the Middle Eocene, with modern borders shown

The second species of Uintatherium, U. insperatus, lived in the Lushi Formation what is now Henan, China during the Middle Eocene. The precise age of the fossils assigned to this species are uncertain, but they have been estimated to be between 48 and 37 million years ago, which is roughly contemporaneous with the existence of U. anceps in North America. This corresponds to the Sharamurunian Asian land mammal age, which lasted for about the same length of time. Remains assigned to U. cf. insperatus have also been found in the similarly-aged Uqbulak Formation in the Junggar Basin.

The composition of Asian land mammal assemblages was similar in several ways to the contemporary assemblages in North America, although the precise timing of faunal turnover is not as well studied with respect to Eocene ecosystems in Asia. The carnivorous mammals of the continent were generally similar, with mesonychids, haplodectids, hyaenodontids and the carnivoramorphan Miacis being the most abundant predators. However, several endemic carnivores coexisted with these including Eusmilus (an early nimravid), Cynodictis (a primitive amphicyonid) and the controversial carnivorous ungulate Andrewsarchus. Prey for these animals included a diverse array of terrestrial ungulates including late surviving members of Paleocene lineages such as the coryphodont Eudinoceras, dichobunids, tillodontians and taeniodontans. Ungulate groups common in North America were also represented, including Hyrachyus as well as the helohyids, brontotheriids, helaletiids and amynodontids. They were accompanied by a diverse array of perissodactyls, which underwent a radiation in Asia during the Middle Eocene. These new groups included the paraceratheriids, hyracodontids, chalicotheriids and deperetellids. The artiodactyl anthracotheres also first evolved in Asia during this period.
