= Rodcania =

Rodcania Temporal range: Paleocene ~62–56 Ma

Scientific classification
- Domain: Eukaryota
- Kingdom: Animalia
- Phylum: Chordata
- Class: Mammalia
- Order: †Xenungulata
- Family: †Carodniidae
- Genus: †Rodcania; Gelfo, García-López & Bergqvist 2020

Type species
- Rodcania kakan Gelfo, García-López & Bergqvist 2020

Species
- R. kakan Gelfo, García-López & Bergqvist 2020

Extinct genus of mammals

Rodcania is an extinct genus of mammal, belonging to the order Xenungulata. It contains a single species, Rodcania kakan, which lived during the Paleocene. Its remains were found in South America. The genus name is an anagram of Carodnia.

== Description ==
This animal is only known from scarce fossil remains, and its appearance is therefore only conjectural. From a comparison with its relative Carodnia, it is supposed that Rodcania was a rather heavy animal with a massive build and strong legs. An adult Rodcania could weigh around 165 kilograms. Rodcania is only known from a fragmentary left mandible, bearing the second and third molars. Both teeth are characterized by a thick layer of enamel, vertically oriented Hunter-Schreger bands, and distally inclined dental wear marks. Rodcania differs from its similar relative Carodnia and other xenungulates by the simplified and mesiodistally short trigonid of the third molar, the absence of paraconid, the protolophid more oblique with respect to the mesiodistal axis, and by a straight and oblique cristid, directed towards the position of the protoconid, and in the wider and longer thalonid. As in all xenungulates, the second lower molar was bilophodont.

== Classification ==
Rodcania kakan was first described in 2020, based on a fossil from the Rio Loro Formation, dated from the Paleocene, and found in Tucumán Province in Northwestern Argentina. According to phylogenetic analyzes present in that description, Rodcania is a basal member of the Carodniidae, one of the two families of xenungulates, a group of large archaid mammals, typical of the Paleocene and Eocene of South America, that may be related with Pyrotheres and Notoungulates.

== Paleoecology ==
Rodcania, about the size of a large tapir, was the largest animal from the Rio Loro fauna. The increase in size of xenungulates does not show a clear relationship with the evolution of increasingly derived forms.
