= Río Loro Formation =

Geological formation in Argentina

- Stratigraphic range: Late Paleocene (Riochican); ~58–56 Ma
- Type: Geological formation
- Underlies: Río Nío Formation
- Overlies: Los Blanquitos Formation
- Thickness: 95 m (312 ft)

Lithology
- Primary: Sandstone, siltstone
- Other: Conglomerate, paleosols

Location
- Coordinates: 26.6°S 65.2°W
- Approximate paleocoordinates: 29.3°S 53.8°W
- Region: Tucumán Province
- Country: Argentina
- Extent: Sierras Pampeanas

Type section
- Named for: Río Loro
- Named by: Bossi
- Year defined: 1969
- Río Loro Formation (Argentina)

The Río Loro Formation is a geological formation of the Sierras Pampeanas in Tucumán Province Argentina whose strata date back to the Late Paleocene of the Paleogene, or Riochican in the SALMA classification.

The formation has been deposited in a meandering fluvial environment and has a maximum noted thickness of 95 metres (312 ft).

The formation has provided fossils of several mammals and reptiles. The crocodylian genus Lorosuchus and mammal species Eoastrapostylops riolorense were named after the formation which is correlated with the Mealla Formation of the Salta Basin to the northwest of Tucumán Province.

== Description ==
The Río Loro Formation crops out in the Sierra Medina, north of Tucumán city. The formation, first defined by Bossi in 1969, reaches a thickness of 95 metres (312 ft), and comprises red sandstones and siltstones deposited in a fluvial meandering environment.

The Río Loro Formation unconformably overlies the Cretaceous Los Blanquitos Formation and is overlain by the Río Nío Formation. The Río Loro Formation is correlated with the Mealla Formation of the Salta Basin to the northeast.

== Fossil content ==
The following fossils were reported from the formation:

- Mammals
  - Notoungulates
    - Satshatemnus bonapartei
  - Eutheria
    - Notonychops powelli
  - Xenungulata
    - Rodcania kakan
  - Placentalia
    - Eoastrapostylops riolorense
- Reptiles
  - Turtles
    - Podocnemis cf. argentinensis
  - Crocodylians
    - Lorosuchus nodosus

== See also ==
- South American land mammal ages
- Itaboraí Formation
