= Notoetayoa =

Notoetayoa Temporal range: Middle Paleocene ~61–58 Ma

Scientific classification
- Kingdom: Animalia
- Phylum: Chordata
- Class: Mammalia
- Order: †Xenungulata
- Family: †Carodniidae
- Genus: †Notoetayoa; Gelfo, López & Bond 2008

Type species
- Notoetayoa gargantuai Gelfo, López & Bond, 2008

Species
- N. gargantuai Gelfo, López & Bond 2008

Extinct genus of mammals

Notoetayoa is an extinct genus of mammal, from the order Xenungulata. It contains a single species, Notoetayoa gargantuai, which lived during the Middle Paleocene. Its fossilized remains were discovered in South America.

== Description ==
This animal is only known from a fragment of its jaw, and it is therefore impossible to precisely reconstruct its appearance. From a comparison with a similar but better known animal, Carodnia, it is possible that Notoetayoa was an animal with heavy shapes and a powerful body. The size of Notoetayoa was in any cases smaller than that of Carodnia, and it is possible that it was as large as a small tapir.

The lower third molar had a higher trigonid than the thalonid, and the paraconid was well defined, and not fused with the metaconid. Compared to its relative Etayoa, its metachristid was short, and the precingulid was more robust than in Etayoa and Carodnia. The talonid basin wasn't open lingually as in Carodnia, but closed as in Etayoa. The hypoconid and the hypoconulid were distinct and united by a low and rounded postmetacristid. The entoconid was crenulated and mesially projected towards the distal-lingual side of the metaconid. The distal root under the talonid was not vertical as in Carodnia but oblique to the mesial one.

== Classification ==
Notoetayoa gargantuai was first described in 2008, based on fossilized remains found in the Chubut Province of Argentina, in Patagonia, in rocks dated from the Middle Paleocene. Notoetayoa is considered to be a member of the Xenungulates, an enigmatic group of South American ungulates of uncertain affinities. In particular, Notoetayoa is considered very similar to Etayoa, and both genus are sometimes placed within the Etayoidae family. However, compared to its relative, Notoetayoa was of much larger dimensions. The discovery of Notoetayoa has expanded the knowledge on Etayoiids both geographically and stratigraphically, as until the description of Notoetayoa they had only been found further north in Colombia, in more recent soils from the Late Paleocene to the Early Eocene.

== References and Bibliography ==
- J. N. Gelfo, G. M. López, and M. Bond. 2008. A new Xenungulata (Mammalia) from the Paleocene of Patagonia Argentina. Journal of Paleontology 82(2):329-335
- P.-O. Antoine, G. Billet, R. Salas-Gismondi, J. T. Lara, P. Baby, S. Brusset, and N. Espurt. 2015. A New Carodnia Simpson, 1935 (Mammalia, Xenungulata) from the Early Eocene of Northwestern Peru and a Phylogeny of Xenungulates at Species Level. Journal of Mammalian Evolution 22:129-140
