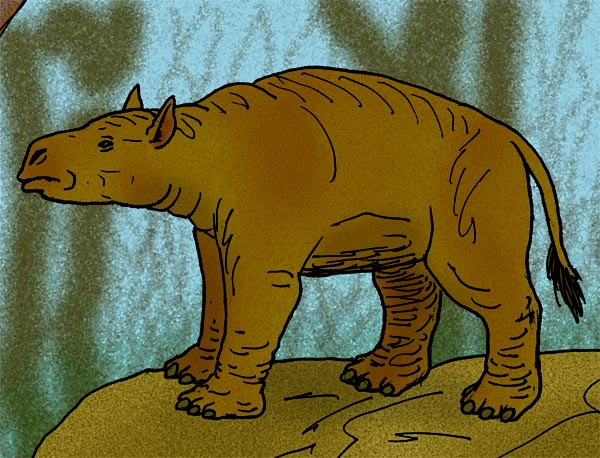
- Interpretation of Carodnia vieirai

Scientific classification
- Kingdom: Animalia
- Phylum: Chordata
- Class: Mammalia
- Infraclass: Placentalia
- Clade: †Meridiungulata
- Order: †Xenungulata; Paula Couto 1952

Family and genera
- †Carodniidae Paula Couto 1952; †Carodnia Simpson 1935; †Etayoa Villarroel 1987; †Rodcania Gelfo, García-López & Bergqvist 2020; †Notoetayoa Gelfo, López & Bond 2008

= Xenungulata =

Xenungulata Temporal range: Late Paleocene-Early Eocene (Riochican-Casamayoran) ~58.6–48.7 Ma

Extinct order of mammals

Xenungulata ("strange ungulates") is an order of extinct and primitive South American hoofed mammals that lived from the Late Paleocene to Early Eocene (Itaboraian to Casamayoran in the SALMA classification). Fossils of the order are known from deposits in Brazil, Argentina, Peru, and Colombia. The best known member of this enigmatic order is the genus Carodnia, a tapir-like and -sized animal with a gait similar to living African elephants.

== Description ==
Xenungulates are characterized by bilophodont M^{1–2} and M_{1–2}, similar to pyrotheres, and complex lophate third molars, similar to uintatheres. Though other relationships, to arctocyonids for example, have been suggested, no proofs thereof have been found. The foot bones of xenungulates were short and robust and their digits terminated in broad, flat, and unfissured hoof-like unguals, quite unlike any other meridiungulates. The discovery of Etayoa in Colombia made it clear that xenungulates are distinct from other groups: Etayoa lacks lophate molar talonid (in contrast to Carodnia) and, since no distinct lophodonty is present in basal pyrotheres, there is reason to assume that bilophodonty evolved separately in xenungulates and pyrotheres. Xenungulates also show some dental similarity to primitive astrapotheres.

== Taxonomy ==
Cifelli 1983 grouped Carodnia with pyrotheres based on a similarity in astragalus morphology, but later concluded that this observation was incorrect.

Notoetayoa is most closely related to Etayoa.

== Distribution ==
Locations of Xenungulata fossils
Bogotá Formation
Peñas Coloradas Formation
Mogollón Formation
Itaboraí Formation

Xenungulata fossils have been found in:

- Bogotá Formation, Casamayoran, Colombia
- Peñas Coloradas Formation, Riochican, Argentina
- Mogollón Formation, Itaboraian-Riochican, Peru
- Itaboraí Formation, Itaboraian, Brazil
