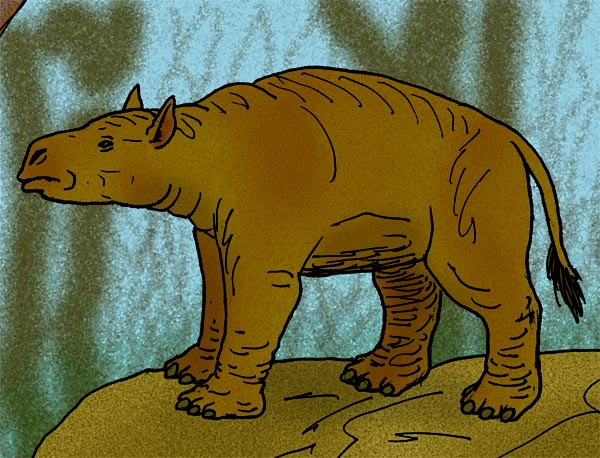
- Carodnia vieirai

Scientific classification
- Kingdom: Animalia
- Phylum: Chordata
- Class: Mammalia
- Infraclass: Placentalia
- Order: †Xenungulata
- Family: †Carodniidae
- Genus: †Carodnia; Simpson 1935

Species
- †C. vieirai Paula Couto 1952; †C. cabrerai Simpson 1935; †C. feruglioi Simpson 1935; †C. inexpectans; †C. karuen

Synonyms
- Ctalecarodnia Simpson 1935

= Carodnia =

Carodnia Temporal range: Early Paleocene-Early Eocene ("Carodnia zone"-Casamayoran) ~62–48.6 Ma

Genus of South American hoofed mammals (fossil)

Carodnia is an extinct genus of South American ungulate known from the Early Paleocene and Early Eocene of Brazil, Argentina, and Peru. Carodnia is placed in the order Xenungulata together with Etayoa and Notoetayoa.

Carodnia is the largest mammal known from the Eocene of South America. It was heavily built and had large canines and cheek teeth with a crested pattern like the uintatheres to which it can be related. In life, it would have been a tapir-sized animal. It bore strong resemblances to dinoceratans, although without tusks or ossicones. When George Simpson first described Carodnia, he cited the genus name as being derived from the Tehuelche word for thunder "carodn".

== Description ==
Size comparison between a human and C. vieirai

Simpson noted that Carodnia resembles the primitive uintathere Probathyopsis. Although Paula Couto also made the same favorable comparison, he placed Carodnia in the new order Xenungulata. Gingerich 1985 concluded that Probathyopsis shares several dental characteristics with Carodnia, but that in the latter the anterior dentition of is more reduced, the second lower and upper premolars are enlarged and pointed, and that the first and second molars are more lophodont. Gingerich thought the differences could justify a separate family for Carodnia but proposed that it should be included in Probathyopsis,Cifelli 1983 grouped Carodnia with Pyrotheria but later concluded that this was a mistake.

Carodnia is characterized by bilophodont (Note: A loph is a crest on the crown of a tooth. A bilophodont tooth has two parallel lophs running transversally across the tooth.) first and second molars and more complex lophate third molars, which suggests possible links to pyrotheres, uintatheres, and even arctocyonids. The bones of the foot are short and robust and the digits terminate in broad, flat, and unfissured hoof-like unguals, unlike any other known meridiungulate.

C. feruglioi and C. cabrerai, from the Riochican in the SALMA classification of Patagonia, are known from only a few dental remains. C. vieirai (from the Itaboraian SALMA of Itaborai) is known from much more complete dental, cranial, and postcranial remains including an almost complete mandible, many vertebrae, and several partial leg bones. The oldest Carodnia fossils occupy a biozone known as the "Carodnia zone", from the end of the Danian (early Paleocene), about 62 million years ago. The "Carodnia zone" was previously considered early Eocene and part of the Riochican.

When Simpson 1935 first described Carodnia and Ctalecarodnia, the former was known only from a left lower molar which was lacking in the latter, making a comparison very difficult. Paula Couto 1952, based on considerably more complete remains, concluded that the molars and premolars of both are indistinguishable and therefore reduced Ctalecarodnia to a synonym. Paula Couto also noted that the dentition of C. cabrerai and C. feruglioi are similar except in size, and that C. feruglioi can be a juvenile C. cabrerai, but nevertheless left them as two distinct species.

== Distribution ==
Fossils of Carodnia have been found in:

- Peñas Coloradas Formation, Argentina
- Itaboraí Formation, Brazil
- Mogollón Formation, Peru

== Itaboraian correlations ==
Itaboraian correlations in South America
Formation	Itaboraí	Las Flores	Koluel Kaike	Maíz Gordo	Muñani	Mogollón	Bogotá	Cerrejón	Ypresian (IUCS) • Wasatchian (NALMA) Bumbanian (ALMA) • Mangaorapan (NZ)
Basin	Itaboraí	Golfo San Jorge		Salta	Altiplano Basin	Talara & Tumbes	Altiplano Cundiboyacense	Cesar-Ranchería	Carodnia (South America)
Country	Brazil	Argentina			Peru		Colombia		Carodnia (South America)
Carodnia									Carodnia (South America)
Gashternia									Carodnia (South America)
Henricosbornia									Carodnia (South America)
Victorlemoinea									Carodnia (South America)
Polydolopimorphia									Carodnia (South America)
Birds									Carodnia (South America)
Reptiles									Carodnia (South America)
Fish									Carodnia (South America)
Flora									Carodnia (South America)
Environments	Alluvial-lacustrine	Alluvial-fluvial		Fluvio-lacustrine	Lacustrine	Fluvial	Fluvio-deltaic		Itaboraian volcanoclastics Itaboraian fauna Itaboraian flora
Volcanic			Yes						Itaboraian volcanoclastics Itaboraian fauna Itaboraian flora
