= Riochican =

Geologic age

The Riochican (Spanish: Riochiquense) age is a period of geologic time within the early Eocene epoch of the Paleogene, used more specifically within the South American land mammal ages (SALMA) system. This age is named after the Río Chico Group of Argentina's Golfo San Jorge Basin, and in its broad original definition, the Riochican occupies a wide Paleocene-early Eocene time interval.

The Riochican has subsequently been split up into three narrower faunal zones: the Carodnia zone, Kibenikhoria zone, and Ernestokokenia chaishoer zone. The Carodnia zone is late early Paleocene (Danian) in age, about 62 million years old, and follows the Peligran SALMA age. The Kibenikhoria zone is equivalent to the Itaboraian SALMA age, which is early Eocene (53–50 Ma). Finally, the Ernestokokenia zone (Riochican sensu stricto), at around 49 Ma, precedes the informal "Sapoan" and formal Casamayoran SALMA ages.

== Formations ==
Locations of Riochican formations

Formation bold is type	Country	Basin	Notes
Río Chico Group	Argentina	Golfo San Jorge Basin	
Bogotá Formation	Colombia	Altiplano Cundiboyacense	
Bororó Formation	Argentina	Golfo San Jorge Basin	
Chota Formation	Peru	Bagua Basin	
Koluel Kaike Formation	Argentina	Golfo San Jorge Basin	
Las Flores Formation	Argentina	Austral Basin	
Maíz Gordo Formation	Argentina	Salta Basin	
Mealla Formation	Argentina	Salta Basin	
Mogollón Formation	Peru	Talara & Tumbes Basins	
Muñani Formation	Peru	Altiplano Basin	
Peñas Coloradas Formation	Argentina	Golfo San Jorge Basin	
Río Loro Formation	Argentina	Sierras Pampeanas	
Salamanca Formation	Argentina	Golfo San Jorge Basin	

== Fossils ==
Group	Fossils	Formation	Notes
Mammals	Etayoa bacatensis	Bogotá	
Mammals	Brandmayria simpsoni, Ernestokokenia chaishoer, E. ?yirunhor, Isotemnus cf. primitivus, Palangania brandmayri, Anisolambda sp., Henricosbornia sp., Josepholeidya sp., Notopithecus sp., Othnielmarshia sp., Polydolops winecage, Ricardolydekkeria sp., Trigonostylops sp., Victorlemoinea sp., ?Eohyrax sp., ?Nemolestes sp., ?Notostylops sp., ?Pleurostylodon sp., ?Polystylops sp., ?Postpithecus sp., Dasypodidae indet.	Koluel Kaike	
Mammals	Eoastrapostylops riolorense, Notonychops powelli, Satshatemnus bonapartei	Río Loro	
Reptiles & amphibians	Testudines indet.	Koluel Kaike	
Reptiles & amphibians	Pelomedusoides sp.	Maíz Gordo	
Reptiles & amphibians	Lorosuchus nodosus, Pelomedusoides cf. argentinensis	Río Loro	
Fishes	?Cyprinodon primulus	Maíz Gordo	
Insects	Anthicus sepultulus, Austrolibellula noroestenia, Carabites harringtoni, Celinapterix bellissima, Cryptophagus sunchalensis, Curculionites harringtoni, C. jujuyensis, C. magdalinus, C. parastictus, C. stebingeri, C. sunchalicus, C. wielandi, Curviarculia delicata, C. lamasi, Gryllites vocalis, Jujusia maizgorda, Latibasalia elongata, L. quispeae, Lebia harrelli, Ormenis devincta, Otiorhynchites aterrimus, O. crassus, Palaeomacromia multicellulata, Palaeophya argentina, Promegalestes singularis, Tenebrionites inclinans, Thyridates novokschonovi, ?Anthonomus sunchalensis, ?Corizus deflagratus, ?Cossonus devoratus, ?Haruspex defectus, ?Molanna derosa, ?Podabrus santaritensis, ?Trichodes stebingeri	Maíz Gordo	
Flora	Banaraphyllum ovatum, Cissites patagonica, Cryptocaryoides mariasantisimensis, Dryophyllum australis, Fagophyllum duseni, Laurophyllum chubutensis, Laurophyllum piatnitzkyi, Myrica premira, Nothofagidites visserensis, Paranymphaea aristolochiaformis, Sterculia acuminataloba, Zizyphus chubutensis	Río Chico	
Flora	Palmoxylon patagonicum	Bororó	
Flora	Cordioxylon prototrichotoma	Peñas; Coloradas	
Flora	Palmoxylon patagonicum	Salamanca	
