= Bogotá Formation =

Geological formation in Bogotá, Colombia

- Stratigraphic range: Late Paleocene-Early Eocene (Peligran-Casamayoran); 61.66–52.5 Ma
- Type: Geological formation
- Underlies: Regadera Formation
- Overlies: Cacho Formation
- Thickness: 169–1,415 m (554–4,642 ft)

Lithology
- Primary: Mudstone, shale, siltstone
- Other: Sandstone

Location
- Coordinates: 4°29′18.4″N 74°08′08.5″W
- Region: Bogotá savanna & Eastern Hills, Altiplano Cundiboyacense; Eastern Ranges, Andes
- Country: Colombia

Type section
- Named for: Bogotá
- Named by: Hettner
- Location: Ciudad Bolívar, Bogotá
- Year defined: 1892
- Coordinates: 4°29′18.4″N 74°08′08.5″W
- Approximate paleocoordinates: 2.1°N 62.4°W
- Region: Cundinamarca
- Country: Colombia
- Bogotá Formation (Colombia)

The Bogotá Formation (Spanish: Formación Bogotá, E_{1-2}b, Tpb, Pgb) is a geological formation of the Eastern Hills and Bogotá savanna on the Altiplano Cundiboyacense, Eastern Ranges of the Colombian Andes. The predominantly shale and siltstone formation, with sandstone beds intercalated, dates to the Paleogene period; Upper Paleocene to Lower Eocene epochs, with an age range of 61.66 to 52.5 Ma, spanning the Paleocene–Eocene Thermal Maximum. The thickness of the Bogotá Formation ranges from 169 metres (554 ft) near Tunja to 1,415 metres (4,642 ft) near Bogotá. Fossils of the ungulate Etayoa bacatensis have been found in the Bogotá Formation, as well as numerous reptiles, unnamed as of 2017.

== Etymology ==
The formation was first described by Hettner in 1892, then by Hubach in 1931, 1945 and 1957, and named in 1963 by Julivert after the Colombian capital Bogotá and its savanna.

== Description ==
The Bogotá Formation was deposited during the Paleocene–Eocene Thermal Maximum, here indicated as LPTM

=== Lithologies ===
The Bogotá Formation consists mainly of grayish-red, locally purplish, commonly greenish-gray, generally poorly stratified mudstone and silty claystone. Lithic arenite sandstone lenses, ranging from fine- to medium-grained, generally friable and variegated, are local constituents. Carbonaceous material is present as thin beds of low-grade argillaceous coal, north of Bogotá. Fossil remains of Etaoya bacatensis, named after Colombian geologist Fernando Etayo and the indigenous name for the Bogotá savanna, Bacatá, have been found in Ciudad Bolívar, close to the type locality of the Bogotá Formation. Additionally, macroflora of Palaeophytocrene hammenii, named after Dutch botanist Thomas van der Hammen, and pollen of Foveotriletes margaritae, Proxapertites operculatus and Foveotricolpites perforatus have been found, used for dating the formation. Other pollen and flora, as Ulmoideipites krempii, Carpolithus, Anemocardium margaritae, and Hickeycarpum peltatum have been found in the Bogotá Formation. The abundant paleosols of the Bogotá Formation show an increase in chemical weathering across the Paleocene-Eocene (P-E) transition; the Paleocene–Eocene Thermal Maximum.

Later analysis has found several other species, such as pleurodire turtles, found at the Doña Juana dump, dyrosaurid mesoeucrocodylians, boid snakes, dipnoan fishes, frogs, lizards, sebecid crocodyliforms and 11 fossils of mammals. The find of a derived snake in the Lower Eocene section of the formation represents the oldest New World record. The finds of iguanians, including the fossil record of hoplocercines, and boine, caenophidian, and ungaliophiine snakes, indicate a tropical forest environment, present just before the Early Eocene Climatic Optimum (EECO). The faunal distribution has been correlated to the Carodnia-, Amphidolops-, and Wainka-bearing Peñas Coloradas Formation of the Golfo San Jorge Basin in Patagonia, Argentina.

=== Stratigraphy and depositional environment ===
The Bogotá Formation, with a thickness of 169 metres (554 ft) close to Tunja to 1,415 metres (4,642 ft) near Bogotá, overlies the Cacho Formation and is overlain by the Regadera Formation. The age has been estimated to be Late Paleocene to Early Eocene. The middle part of the succession has been dated using detrital zircons at 56.2 ± 1.6 Ma. The spread of ages based on zircons has been reported from 60.96 ± 0.7 to 53.6 ± 1.1 Ma. The Bogotá Formation is laterally equivalent with the shales of the Socha Formation, the San Fernando Formation, the El Limbo Formation, Los Cuervos Formation, and the fossil-rich Cerrejón Formation of La Guajira.

== Outcrops ==
Type locality of the Bogotá Formation in the south of the Bogotá savanna

The Bogotá Formation is apart from its type locality, found in the synclinals of the Río Frío, Checua-Lenguazaque, Sesquilé, Sisga, Subachoque, around Lake Suesca, in the Tenza Valley, and in the synclinals of Teusacá and Usme. In the Usme Synclinal, the formation has a thickness of 436.5 metres (1,432 ft). The campus of the Universidad La Javeriana has the Bogotá Formation as solid basement rock.

The Bogotá Formation forms the footwall of the eastward compressional Chicamocha Fault, and the footwall of the westward thrusting Bogotá Fault.

== Regional correlations ==
Stratigraphy of the Llanos Basin and surrounding provinces
Ma	Age	Paleomap	Regional events	Catatumbo	Cordillera	proximal Llanos	distal Llanos	Putumayo	VSM	Environments	Maximum thickness	Petroleum geology	Notes
0.01	Holocene		Holocene volcanism Seismic activity	alluvium								Overburden	
1	Pleistocene		Pleistocene volcanism Andean orogeny 3 Glaciations	Guayabo	Soatá; Sabana	Necesidad	Guayabo	Gigante Neiva		Alluvial to fluvial (Guayabo)	550 m (1,800 ft) (Guayabo)	Overburden	
2.6	Pliocene		Pliocene volcanism Andean orogeny 3 GABI	Guayabo	Subachoque	Necesidad	Guayabo	Gigante Neiva		Alluvial to fluvial (Guayabo)	550 m (1,800 ft) (Guayabo)	Overburden	
5.3	Messinian		Andean orogeny 3 Foreland	Guayabo	Marichuela	Necesidad	Guayabo	Caimán	Honda	Alluvial to fluvial (Guayabo)	550 m (1,800 ft) (Guayabo)	Overburden	
13.5	Langhian		Regional flooding	León	hiatus	Caja	León	Caimán	Honda	Lacustrine (León)	400 m (1,300 ft) (León)	Seal	
16.2	Burdigalian		Miocene inundations Andean orogeny 2	C1	hiatus	Carbonera C1		Ospina	Honda	Proximal fluvio-deltaic (C1)	850 m (2,790 ft) (Carbonera)	Reservoir	
17.3	Burdigalian		Miocene inundations Andean orogeny 2	C2	hiatus	Carbonera C2		Ospina	Honda	Distal lacustrine-deltaic (C2)	850 m (2,790 ft) (Carbonera)	Seal	
19	Burdigalian		Miocene inundations Andean orogeny 2	C3	hiatus	Carbonera C3		Ospina	Honda	Proximal fluvio-deltaic (C3)	850 m (2,790 ft) (Carbonera)	Reservoir	
21	Early Miocene		Pebas wetlands	C4	hiatus	Carbonera C4		Ospina	Barzalosa	Distal fluvio-deltaic (C4)	850 m (2,790 ft) (Carbonera)	Seal	
23	Late Oligocene		Andean orogeny 1 Foredeep	C5	hiatus	Carbonera C5		Orito		Proximal fluvio-deltaic (C5)	850 m (2,790 ft) (Carbonera)	Reservoir	
25	Late Oligocene		Andean orogeny 1 Foredeep	C6	hiatus	Carbonera C6		Orito		Distal fluvio-lacustrine (C6)	850 m (2,790 ft) (Carbonera)	Seal	
28	Early Oligocene		Andean orogeny 1 Foredeep	C7	hiatus	C7		Pepino	Gualanday	Proximal deltaic-marine (C7)	850 m (2,790 ft) (Carbonera)	Reservoir	
32	Oligo-Eocene		Andean orogeny 1 Foredeep	C8	Usme	C8	onlap	Pepino	Gualanday	Marine-deltaic (C8)	850 m (2,790 ft) (Carbonera)	Seal; Source	
35	Late Eocene		Andean orogeny 1 Foredeep	Mirador	Usme	Mirador		Pepino	Gualanday	Coastal (Mirador)	240 m (790 ft) (Mirador)	Reservoir	
40	Middle Eocene		Andean orogeny 1 Foredeep	Mirador	Regadera	Mirador		Pepino	hiatus	Coastal (Mirador)	240 m (790 ft) (Mirador)	Reservoir	
45	Middle Eocene		Andean orogeny 1 Foredeep	Mirador	Regadera	Mirador		Pepino	hiatus	Coastal (Mirador)	240 m (790 ft) (Mirador)	Reservoir	
50	Early Eocene		Andean orogeny 1 Foredeep	Socha	Regadera	Los Cuervos		Pepino	hiatus	Deltaic (Los Cuervos)	260 m (850 ft) (Los Cuervos)	Seal; Source	
55	Late Paleocene		PETM; 2000 ppm CO_{2}	Los Cuervos	Bogotá	Los Cuervos		Pepino	Gualanday	Deltaic (Los Cuervos)	260 m (850 ft) (Los Cuervos)	Seal; Source	
60	Early Paleocene		SALMA	Barco	Guaduas	Barco		Rumiyaco	Gualanday	Fluvial (Barco)	225 m (738 ft) (Barco)	Reservoir	
65	Maastrichtian		KT extinction	Catatumbo	Guadalupe			Rumiyaco	Monserrate	Deltaic-fluvial (Guadalupe)	750 m (2,460 ft) (Guadalupe)	Reservoir	
72	Campanian		End of rifting	Colón-Mito Juan	Guadalupe			Rumiyaco	Monserrate	Deltaic-fluvial (Guadalupe)	750 m (2,460 ft) (Guadalupe)	Reservoir	
83	Santonian		End of rifting	Colón-Mito Juan	Guadalupe			Villeta/Güagüaquí		Deltaic-fluvial (Guadalupe)	750 m (2,460 ft) (Guadalupe)	Reservoir	
86	Coniacian		End of rifting	Colón-Mito Juan	Guadalupe			Villeta/Güagüaquí		Deltaic-fluvial (Guadalupe)	750 m (2,460 ft) (Guadalupe)	Reservoir	
89	Turonian		Cenomanian-Turonian anoxic event	La Luna	Chipaque	Gachetá	hiatus	Villeta/Güagüaquí		Restricted marine (all)	500 m (1,600 ft) (Gachetá)	Source	
93	Cenomanian		Rift 2	La Luna	Chipaque	Gachetá	hiatus	Villeta/Güagüaquí		Restricted marine (all)	500 m (1,600 ft) (Gachetá)	Source	
100	Albian		Rift 2	La Luna	Une	Une	hiatus	Caballos		Deltaic (Une)	500 m (1,600 ft) (Une)	Reservoir	
113	Aptian		Rift 2	Capacho	Fómeque	Une	hiatus	Motema	Yaví	Open marine (Fómeque)	800 m (2,600 ft) (Fómeque)	Source (Fóm)	
125	Barremian		High biodiversity	Aguardiente	Paja	Une	hiatus	Motema	Yaví	Shallow to open marine (Paja)	940 m (3,080 ft) (Paja)	Reservoir	
129	Hauterivian		Rift 1	Tibú- Mercedes	Las Juntas	hiatus	hiatus	Motema	Yaví	Deltaic (Las Juntas)	910 m (2,990 ft) (Las Juntas)	Reservoir (LJun)	
133	Valanginian		Rift 1	Río Negro	Cáqueza; Macanal; Rosablanca	hiatus	hiatus	Motema	Yaví	Restricted marine (Macanal)	2,935 m (9,629 ft) (Macanal)	Source (Mac)	
140	Berriasian		Rift 1	Girón	Cáqueza; Macanal; Rosablanca	hiatus	hiatus	Motema	Yaví	Restricted marine (Macanal)	2,935 m (9,629 ft) (Macanal)	Source (Mac)	
145	Tithonian		Break-up of Pangea	Jordán	Arcabuco	Buenavista Batá	hiatus	Saldaña		Alluvial, fluvial (Buenavista)	110 m (360 ft) (Buenavista)	"Jurassic"	
150	Early-Mid Jurassic		Passive margin 2	La Quinta	Montebel Noreán	hiatus	hiatus	Saldaña		Coastal tuff (La Quinta)	100 m (330 ft) (La Quinta)	"Jurassic"	
201	Late Triassic		Passive margin 2	Mucuchachi	Montebel Noreán	hiatus	hiatus	Payandé				"Jurassic"	
235	Early Triassic		Pangea		hiatus	hiatus	hiatus					"Paleozoic"	
250	Permian		Pangea		hiatus	hiatus	hiatus					"Paleozoic"	
300	Late Carboniferous		Famatinian orogeny		hiatus	hiatus	hiatus		Cerro Neiva ()			"Paleozoic"	
340	Early Carboniferous		Fossil fish Romer's gap		Cuche (355-385)	Farallones ()			Cerro Neiva ()	Deltaic, estuarine (Cuche)	900 m (3,000 ft) (Cuche)	"Paleozoic"	
360	Late Devonian		Passive margin 1	Río Cachirí (360-419)	Cuche (355-385)	Farallones ()			Ambicá ()	Alluvial-fluvial-reef (Farallones)	2,400 m (7,900 ft) (Farallones)	"Paleozoic"	
390	Early Devonian		High biodiversity	Floresta (387-400) El Tíbet					Ambicá ()	Shallow marine (Floresta)	600 m (2,000 ft) (Floresta)	"Paleozoic"	
410	Late Silurian		Silurian mystery	Floresta (387-400) El Tíbet								"Paleozoic"	
425	Early Silurian		Silurian mystery	hiatus								"Paleozoic"	
440	Late Ordovician		Rich fauna in Bolivia	San Pedro (450-490)		Duda ()						"Paleozoic"	
470	Early Ordovician		First fossils	San Pedro (450-490)	Busbanzá (>470±22) Chuscales Otengá	Guape ()		Río Nevado ()	Hígado () Agua Blanca; Venado (470-475)			"Paleozoic"	
488	Late Cambrian		Regional intrusions	Chicamocha (490-515)	Quetame ()	Ariarí ()		SJ del Guaviare (490-590)	San Isidro ()			"Paleozoic"	
515	Early Cambrian		Cambrian explosion		Quetame ()			SJ del Guaviare (490-590)	San Isidro ()			"Paleozoic"	
542	Ediacaran		Break-up of Rodinia		pre-Quetame		post-Parguaza	SJ del Guaviare (490-590)	El Barro ()	Yellow: allochthonous basement (Chibcha terrane); Green: autochthonous basement (Río Negro-Juruena Province)		Basement	
600	Neoproterozoic		Cariri Velhos orogeny	Bucaramanga (600-1400)	pre-Quetame		post-Parguaza	pre-Guaviare	El Barro ()	Yellow: allochthonous basement (Chibcha terrane); Green: autochthonous basement (Río Negro-Juruena Province)		Basement	
800	Neoproterozoic		Snowball Earth	Bucaramanga (600-1400)	pre-Quetame		post-Parguaza	pre-Guaviare	El Barro ()	Yellow: allochthonous basement (Chibcha terrane); Green: autochthonous basement (Río Negro-Juruena Province)		Basement	
1000	Mesoproterozoic		Sunsás orogeny	Bucaramanga (600-1400)	pre-Quetame	Ariarí (1000)	post-Parguaza	pre-Guaviare	La Urraca (1030-1100)	Yellow: allochthonous basement (Chibcha terrane); Green: autochthonous basement (Río Negro-Juruena Province)		Basement	
1300	Mesoproterozoic		Rondônia-Juruá orogeny	Bucaramanga (600-1400)	pre-Quetame	pre-Ariarí	Parguaza (1300-1400)	pre-Guaviare	Garzón (1180-1550)	Yellow: allochthonous basement (Chibcha terrane); Green: autochthonous basement (Río Negro-Juruena Province)		Basement	
1400	Mesoproterozoic		Rondônia-Juruá orogeny	pre-Bucaramanga	pre-Quetame	pre-Ariarí		pre-Guaviare	Garzón (1180-1550)	Yellow: allochthonous basement (Chibcha terrane); Green: autochthonous basement (Río Negro-Juruena Province)		Basement	
1600	Paleoproterozoic		Rondônia-Juruá orogeny	pre-Bucaramanga	pre-Quetame	pre-Ariarí	Maimachi (1500-1700)	pre-Guaviare	pre-Garzón	Yellow: allochthonous basement (Chibcha terrane); Green: autochthonous basement (Río Negro-Juruena Province)		Basement	
1800	Paleoproterozoic		Tapajós orogeny	pre-Bucaramanga	pre-Quetame	pre-Ariarí	Mitú (1800)	pre-Guaviare	pre-Garzón	Yellow: allochthonous basement (Chibcha terrane); Green: autochthonous basement (Río Negro-Juruena Province)		Basement	
1950	Paleoproterozoic		Transamazonic orogeny	pre-Bucaramanga	pre-Quetame	pre-Ariarí	pre-Mitú	pre-Guaviare	pre-Garzón	Yellow: allochthonous basement (Chibcha terrane); Green: autochthonous basement (Río Negro-Juruena Province)		Basement	
2200	Paleoproterozoic		Columbia	pre-Bucaramanga	pre-Quetame	pre-Ariarí	pre-Mitú	pre-Guaviare	pre-Garzón	Yellow: allochthonous basement (Chibcha terrane); Green: autochthonous basement (Río Negro-Juruena Province)		Basement	
2530	Archean		Carajas-Imataca orogeny	pre-Bucaramanga	pre-Quetame	pre-Ariarí	pre-Mitú	pre-Guaviare	pre-Garzón	Yellow: allochthonous basement (Chibcha terrane); Green: autochthonous basement (Río Negro-Juruena Province)		Basement	
3100	Archean		Kenorland	pre-Bucaramanga	pre-Quetame	pre-Ariarí	pre-Mitú	pre-Guaviare	pre-Garzón	Yellow: allochthonous basement (Chibcha terrane); Green: autochthonous basement (Río Negro-Juruena Province)		Basement	

Legend

- group
- important formation
- fossiliferous formation
- minor formation
- (age in Ma)
- proximal Llanos (Medina) (Note: based on Duarte et al. (2019), García González et al. (2009), and geological report of Villavicencio)
- distal Llanos (Saltarin 1A well) (Note: based on Duarte et al. (2019) and the hydrocarbon potential evaluation performed by the UIS and ANH in 2009)

== Itaboraian correlations ==
Itaboraian correlations in South America
Formation	Itaboraí	Las Flores	Koluel Kaike	Maíz Gordo	Muñani	Mogollón	Bogotá	Cerrejón	Ypresian (IUCS) • Wasatchian (NALMA) Bumbanian (ALMA) • Mangaorapan (NZ)
Basin	Itaboraí	Golfo San Jorge		Salta	Altiplano Basin	Talara & Tumbes	Altiplano Cundiboyacense	Cesar-Ranchería	Bogotá Formation (South America)
Country	Brazil	Argentina			Peru		Colombia		Bogotá Formation (South America)
Carodnia									Bogotá Formation (South America)
Gashternia									Bogotá Formation (South America)
Henricosbornia									Bogotá Formation (South America)
Victorlemoinea									Bogotá Formation (South America)
Polydolopimorphia									Bogotá Formation (South America)
Birds									Bogotá Formation (South America)
Reptiles									Bogotá Formation (South America)
Fish									Bogotá Formation (South America)
Flora									Bogotá Formation (South America)
Environments	Alluvial-lacustrine	Alluvial-fluvial		Fluvio-lacustrine	Lacustrine	Fluvial	Fluvio-deltaic		Itaboraian volcanoclastics Itaboraian fauna Itaboraian flora
Volcanic			Yes						Itaboraian volcanoclastics Itaboraian fauna Itaboraian flora

== See also ==
- Geology of the Eastern Hills
- Geology of the Ocetá Páramo
- Geology of the Altiplano Cundiboyacense

== Notes and references ==
=== Bibliography ===
- Acosta Garay, Jorge E.; Ulloa Melo, Carlos E. (2002), Mapa Geológico del Departamento de Cundinamarca - 1:250,000 - Memoria explicativa, INGEOMINAS, pp. 1–108
- Bayona, Germán; Montenegro, Omar; Cardona, Agustín; Jaramillo, Carlos; Lamus, Felipe; Morón, Sara; Quiroz, Luiz; Ruíz, María C.; Valencia & Mauricio Parra, Victor (2010), "Estratigrafía, procedencia, subsidencia y exhumación de las unidades paleógenas en el Sinclinal de Usme, sur de la zona axial de la Cordillera Oriental - Stratigraphy, provenance, subsidence and exhumation of the Paleogene succession in the Usme Syncline, southern axial zone of the Eastern Cordillera" (PDF), Geología Colombiana, 35: 5–35
- Bayona, Germán; Cardona, Agustín; Jaramillo, Carlos; Mora, Andrés; Montes, Camilo; Caballero, Victor; Mahecha, Hernando; Lamus, Felipe; Montenegro, Giovanny Jiménez, Andrés Mesa & Victor Valencia, Omar (2013), "Onset of fault reactivation in the Eastern Cordillera of Colombia and proximal Llanos Basin; response to Caribbean–South American convergence in early Palaeogene time" (PDF), Geological Society, London, Special Publications, 377: 1–31, doi:10.1144/SP377.5
- Bayona, Germán; Cardona, Agustín; Jaramillo, Carlos; Mora, Andrés; Montes, Camilo; Valencia, Victor; Ayala, Carolina; Montenegro, Omar; Ibañez Mejía, Mauricio (2012), "Early Paleogene magmatism in the northern Andes: Insights on the effects of Oceanic Plateau–continent convergence" (PDF), Earth and Planetary Science Letters, 331–332: 97–111, doi:10.1016/j.epsl.2012.03.015
- Bloch, Jonathan Ivan; Cadena, Edwin; Hastings, Alexander; Rincón, Aldo F.; Jaramillo, Carlos (2008), "Vertebrate faunas from the Paleocene Bogotá Formation of northern Colombia (Abstract)", Journal of Vertebrate Paleontology, Society of Vertebrate Paleontology, 68th Annual Meeting: _
- Cadena, Edwin A (2014), "The fossil record of turtles in Colombia; a review of the discoveries, research and future challenges" (PDF), Acta Biológica Colombiana, Universidad Nacional de Colombia, 19 (3): 333–339, doi:10.15446/abc.v19n3.42223
- García Borrero, D.; Alfaro Castillo, A. (2001), La prevención sísmica empieza por casa, estudios de microzonificación sísmica en el campus de la Universidad Javeriana - Bogotá - Colombia (PDF), Congreso Nacional de Ingeniería Física, Guadalajara, Mexico, pp. 1–13
- Guerrero Uscátegui, Alberto Lobo (1992), Geología e Hidrogeología de Santafé de Bogotá y su Sabana, Sociedad Colombiana de Ingenieros, pp. 1–20
- Head, Jason J.; Bloch, Jonathan Ivan; Rincón, Aldo F.; Moreno Bernal, Jorge W. (2012), "Paleogene Squamates from the Northern neotropics: Ecological Implications and Biogeographic Histories (Abstract)", Journal of Vertebrate Paleontology, 72nd Annual Meeting of the Society of vertebrate Paleontology, At Raleigh, North Carolina: _
- Head, Jason J.; Bloch, Jonathan Ivan; Rincón, Aldo F.; Bourque, Jason R.; Jaramillo, Carlos (2011), "An enigmatic derived snake from the earliest Eocene of equatorial South America (Abstract)", Journal of Vertebrate Paleontology, Society of Vertebrate Paleontology, 71st Annual Meeting, Las Vegas, NV: _
- Herrera, Fabiany; Manchester, Steven R.; Carvalho, Mónica R.; Jaramillo, Carlos; Wings, Scott L. (2014), "Paleocene wind-dispersed fruits and seeds from Colombia and their implications for early Neotropical rainforests" (PDF), Acta Paleobotanica, 54 (2): 197–229, doi:10.2478/acpa-2014-0008
- McLaughlin, Donald H (1970), Economic geology of the Zipaquirá quadrangle and adjoining area, Department of Cundinamarca, Colombia (PDF), USGS, pp. 1–126
- Montoya Arenas, Diana María; Reyes Torres, Germán Alfonso (2005), Geología de la Sabana de Bogotá, INGEOMINAS, pp. 1–104
- Morón, Sara; Fox, David L.; Feinberg, Joshua M.; Jaramillo, Carlos; Bayona, Germán; Montes, Camilo; Bloch, Jonathan Ivan (2013), "Climate change during the Early Paleogene in the Bogotá Basin (Colombia) inferred from paleosol carbon isotope stratigraphy, major oxides, and environmental magnetism (Abstract)", Palaeogeography, Palaeoclimatology, Palaeoecology, 388: 115–127, doi:10.1016/j.palaeo.2013.08.010
- Stull, Gregory W.; Herrera, Fabiany; Manchester, Steven R.; Jaramillo, Carlos; Tiffney, Bruce H. (2012), "Fruits of an "Old World" tribe (Phytocreneae; Icacinaceae) from the Paleogene of North and South America", Systematic Botany, 37 (3): 784–794, doi:10.1600/036364412X648724
- Villarroel A., Carlos (1987), "Características y afinadas de Etayoa n. gen., tipo de una nueva familia de Xenungulata (Mammalia) del Paleoceno Medio (?) de Colombia" (PDF), Comunicaciones Paleontológicas del Museo de Historia Natural de Montevideo, 19: 241–254
- Woodburne, Michael O.; Goin, Francisco J.; Bond, Mariano; Carlini, Alfredo A.; Gelfo, Javier N.; López, Guillermo M.; Iglesias, A.; Zimicz, Ana N. (2014), "Paleogene Land Mammal Faunas of South America; a Response to Global Climatic Changes and Indigenous Floral Diversity" (PDF), Journal of Mammalian Evolution, 21: 1–73, doi:10.1007/s10914-012-9222-1

==== Maps ====
- Renzoni, Giancarlo; Rosas, Humberto (2009), Plancha 171 - Duitama - 1:100,000, INGEOMINAS, p. 1
- Fuquen M., Jaime A; Osorno M, José F. (2009), Plancha 190 - Chiquinquirá - 1:100,000, INGEOMINAS, p. 1
- Renzoni, Giancarlo; Rosas, Humberto; Etayo Serna, Fernando (1998), Plancha 191 - Tunja - 1:100,000, INGEOMINAS, p. 1
- Ulloa, Carlos; Acosta, Jorge (1998), Plancha 208 - Villeta - 1:100,000, INGEOMINAS, p. 1
- Montoya, Diana María; Reyes, Germán (2009), Plancha 209 - Zipaquirá - 1:100,000, INGEOMINAS, p. 1
- Terraza, Roberto; Moreno, Giovanni; Buitrago, José A.; Pérez, Adrián; Montoya, Diana María (2010), Plancha 210 - Guateque - 1:100,000, INGEOMINAS, p. 1
- Ulloa, Carlos E; Rodríguez, Erasmo; Acosta, Jorge E. (1998), Plancha 227 - La Mesa - 1:100,000, INGEOMINAS, p. 1
- Buitrago, José Alberto; Terraza M., Roberto; Etayo, Fernando (1998), Plancha 228 - Santafé de Bogotá Noreste - 1:100,000, INGEOMINAS, p. 1
- Acosta, Jorge E.; Ulloa, Carlos E. (1998), Plancha 246 - Fusagasugá - 1:100,000, INGEOMINAS, p. 1
- Acosta, Jorge; Calcedo, Juan Carlos; Ulloa, Carlos (1999), Plancha 265 - Icononzo - 1:100,000, INGEOMINAS, p. 1
- Various, Authors (1997), Mapa geológico de Santa Fe de Bogotá – Geological Map Bogotá – 1:50,000 (PDF), INGEOMINAS, p. 1
