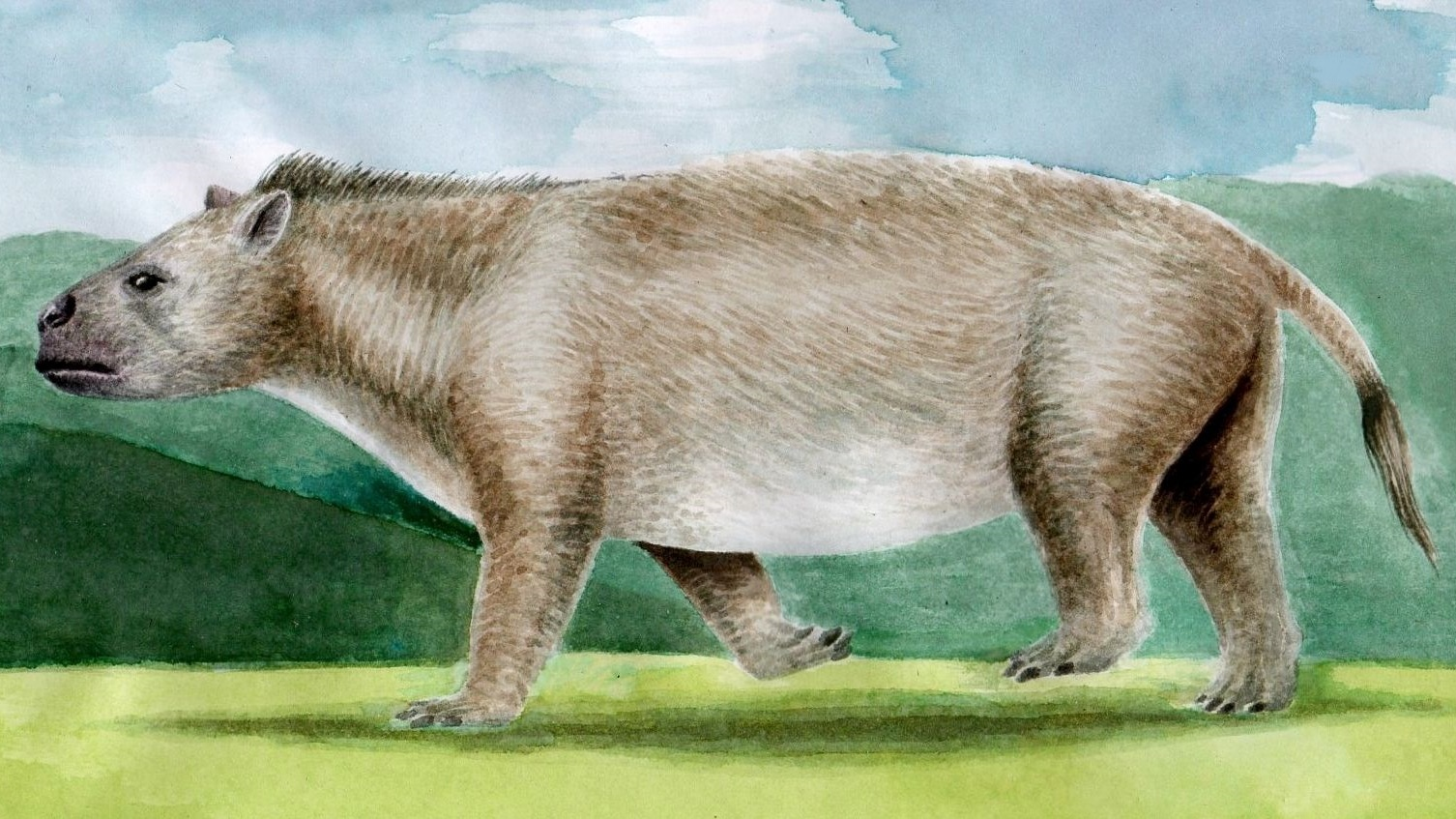
- Life restoration

Scientific classification
- Kingdom: Animalia
- Phylum: Chordata
- Class: Mammalia
- Order: †Xenungulata
- Family: †Carodniidae
- Genus: †Etayoa; Villarroel, 1987
- Species: †E. bacatensis

Binomial name
- †Etayoa bacatensis Villarroel 1987

= Etayoa =

Etayoa Temporal range: Early Eocene (Riochican) ~61.7–55 Ma

Extinct genus of mammals

Etayoa is an ungulate of the family Carodniidae in the order Xenungulata that lived during the Early Eocene (~ 55 Ma) in northern South America.

== Etymology ==
The genus of the type species Etayoa bacatensis was named by palaeontologist Carlos Villarroel after Fernando Etayo Serna, who contributed extensively to the paleontology and stratigraphy research in Colombia. The species epithet bacatensis refers to Bacatá, the name in Muysccubun for the main settlement of the southern Muisca Confederation; the name of which has been used for the current Colombian capital Bogotá, founded in a different location than the original Bacatá.

== Description ==
The type species fossil specimen consists of a partial mandible with teeth, found in the Bogotá Formation in the locality Ciudad Bolívar of Bogotá, Colombia. The estimated size of the ungulate is the size of a dog.

== Paleoclimate and environment ==
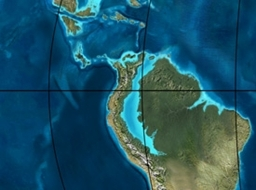
Paleogeography of Northern South America, 50 Ma by Ron Blakey

The finds of iguanians, including the fossil record of hoplocercines, and boine, caenophidian, and ungaliophiine snakes in the Bogotá Formation indicate a tropical forest environment, present just before the Early Eocene Climatic Optimum (EECO). The abundant paleosols of the Bogotá Formation show an increase in chemical weathering across the Paleocene-Eocene (P-E) transition; the Paleocene–Eocene Thermal Maximum.
