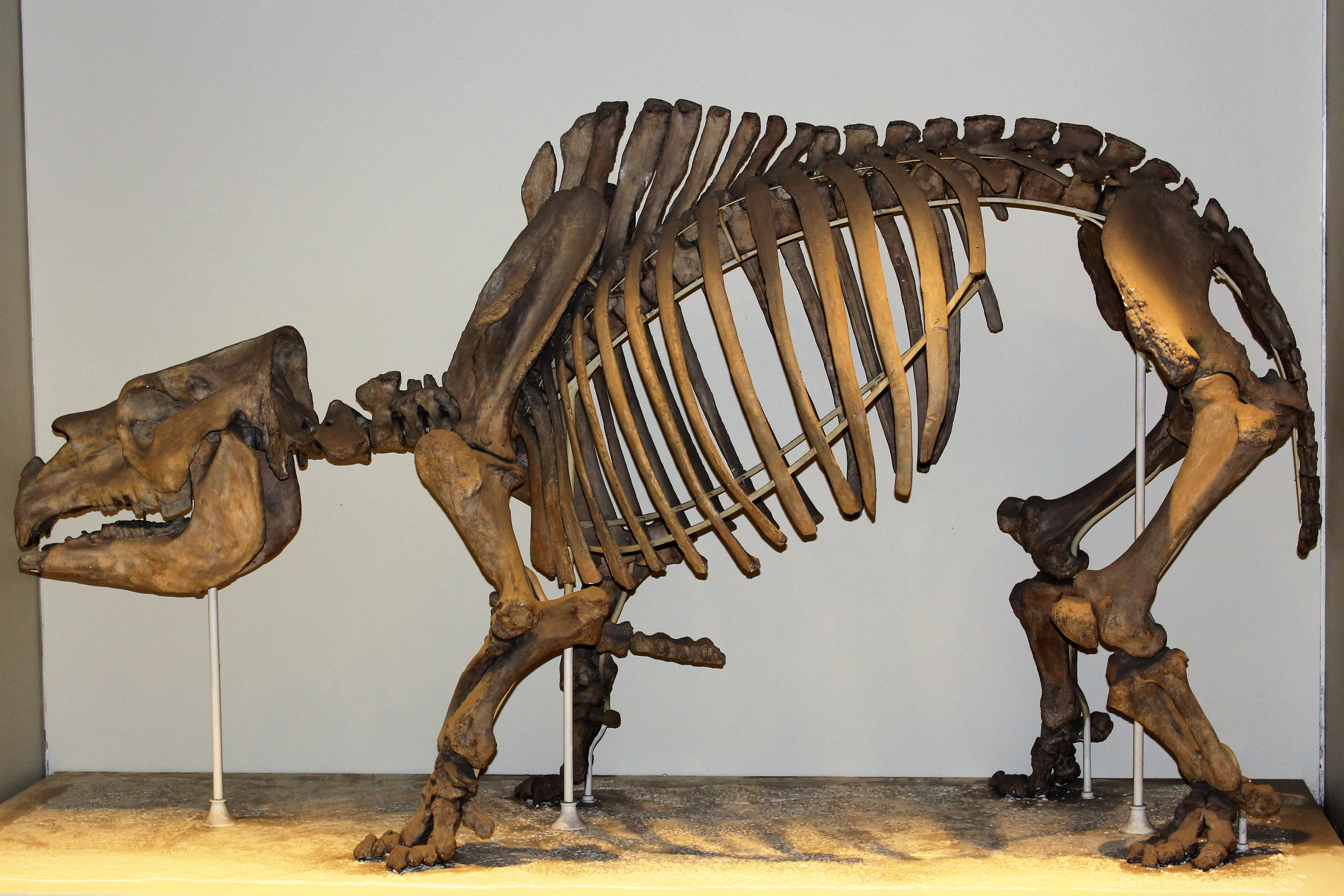
- Toxodon, a notoungulate
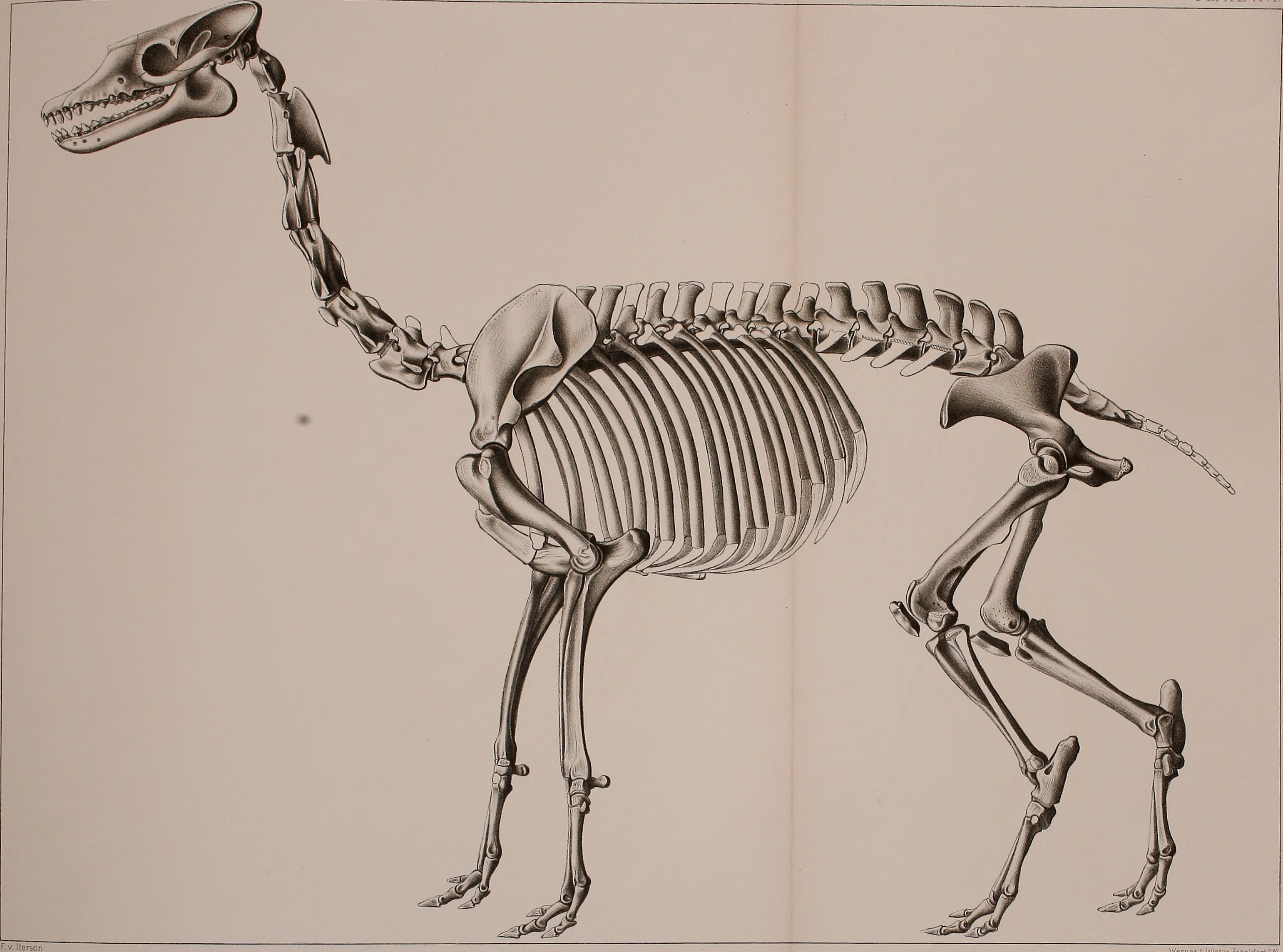
- Theosodon, a litoptern

Scientific classification
- Kingdom: Animalia
- Phylum: Chordata
- Class: Mammalia
- Infraclass: Placentalia
- Clade: †Meridiungulata; McKenna 1975

Orders
- †Astrapotheria; †Litopterna; †Notoungulata; †Pyrotheria; †Xenungulata

= South American native ungulates =

Meridiungulata Temporal range: Paleocene–Holocene

Extinct clade of mammals

The South American native ungulates, commonly abbreviated as SANUs, are an extinct group of placental mammals closely related to or resembling living ungulates that were indigenous to South America. They existed from the early Paleocene (at least 63 million years ago) until the end of the Late Pleistocene (~12,000 years ago). They represented a dominant element of South America's Cenozoic terrestrial mammal fauna prior to the arrival of living ungulate groups in South America during the Pliocene and Pleistocene as part of the Great American Interchange. They comprise five major groups conventionally ranked as orders—Astrapotheria, Litopterna, Notoungulata, Pyrotheria, and Xenungulata—as well as the "condylarth" groups Didolodontidae and Kollpaniinae.

It has been proposed that some or all of the members of this group form a clade, named Meridiungulata, though the relationships of South American ungulates remain largely unresolved. The two largest groups of South American ungulates, the notoungulates and the litopterns, were the only groups to persist beyond the mid Miocene. Only a few (mostly large) species of notoungulates and litopterns survived until the end-Pleistocene extinction event around 12,000 years ago where they became extinct along with most other large mammals in the Americas, shortly after the arrival of the first Paleo-Indians into South America.

Though most SANUs lived in South America, astrapotheres and litopterns are known from Eocene aged deposits in the Antarctic Peninsula and the notoungulate Mixotoxodon spread as far north as what is now Texas during the Pleistocene as part of the Great American Biotic Interchange.

The relationships of SANUs to living mammals has been historically uncertain, though analysis of DNA and collagen suggests that at least notoungulates and litopterns are members of Laurasiatheria, and the sister taxon to living perissodactyls.

== Taxonomy ==
Meridiungulata might have originated in South America from a North American condylarth ancestor, and they may be members of the clade Laurasiatheria, related to other ungulates, including artiodactyls and perissodactyls. It has, however, been suggested the Meridiungulata are part of a different macro-group of placental mammals called Atlantogenata.

Much of the evolution of meridiungulates occurred in isolation from other ungulates, a great example of convergent evolution. However, the argument that meridiungulates are related to artiodactyls and perissodactyls needs support from molecular sequencing. Some paleontologists have also challenged the monophyly of Meridiungulata by suggesting that the pyrotheres are more closely related to other mammals, such as Embrithopoda (an African order possibly related to elephants), than to other South American ungulates.

Molecular sequence data from both collagen and mitochondrial DNA supports that litopterns and notoungulates are most closely related to Perissodactyla (the group containing equids, rhinoceroses, and tapirs) among living mammals, as part of the clade Panperissodactyla, making them true ungulates, which has also been supported by some analyses of morphology. However, other morphological analyses have placed Litopterna elsewhere within Laurasiatheria. Didolodontids may be closely related to litopterns, and it has been proposed that they should be classified within Litopterna, but some analyses do not find them to be close relatives.

Molecular sequence data from collagen suggests Notoungulata and Litopterna are more closely related to each other than to Perissodactyla, suggesting that at least part of Meridiungulata is monophyletic. By contrast, morphology-based analyses have found a range of possible positions for notoungulates. They have been found to be elsewhere within Laurasiatheria, within Afrotheria, and as stem-group atlantogenatans. A position within Afrotheria has been argued to be unlikely on biogeographic grounds, and some of the afrotherian characteristics present in notoungulates have been refuted.

Litopterns and notoungulates are the only South American ungulates to have gone extinct recently enough for molecular data to be available, so the relationships of astrapotheres, pyrotheres, and xenungulates must be determined based on morphology alone.

The clade Sudamericungulata has been proposed to encompass astrapotheres, notoungulates, pyrotheres, and xenoungulates but not litopterns. Such a clade had been found in previous studies, but left unnamed. The study proposing the name Sudamericungulata found them to be afrotheres. The study proposing Sudamericungulata was questioned in a later study, who suggested that the taxon and character sampling in the analysis was poor (including only a single perissodactyl), and that the placement of Sudamericungulata within Afrotheria was not robustly supported, and that a placement within Laurasiatheria was supported for Sudamericungulata and Litopterna when Afrotheria and Laurasiatheria were constrained to be monophyletic by molecular results.

A 2024 study based on morphology supported the monophyly of Meridiungulata as traditionally defined.

== Evolution ==
The earliest SANUs appeared during the early Paleocene, around 63–65 million years ago. SANU diversity reached its greatest extent during the late Eocene and Oligocene periods. During the Miocene, genus and species diversity was stable, but family diversity declined, with litopterns and notoungulates being the only living SANU groups by the late Miocene. During the Pliocene and Pleistocene epochs, SANU diversity substantially declined to the point that there were only a handful of living species by the Late Pleistocene. The causes of the decline are unclear, but may be due to climatic change, or competition/predation from new arrivals from North America as part of the Great American interchange.
