= Itaboraí Formation =

Geologic formation in Rio de Janeiro, Brazil

- Stratigraphic range: Early Eocene (Itaboraian); ~53–50 Ma
- Type: Geological formation
- Sub-units: See text
- Underlies: Early Eocene basalt & Late Eocene to Early Oligocene conglomerates (Rio Frio Formation)
- Overlies: Precambrian basement
- Area: 1 km^{2} (0.39 sq mi)
- Thickness: up to 100 m (330 ft)

Lithology
- Primary: Limestone, marl
- Other: Travertine, lignite

Location
- Coordinates: 22.1°S 41.6°W
- Approximate paleocoordinates: 25.0°S 30.0°W
- Region: Rio de Janeiro
- Country: Brazil
- Extent: Itaboraí Basin

Type section
- Named for: Itaboraí
- Named by: Leinz
- Year defined: 1938
- Itaboraí Formation (Brazil)

The Itaboraí Formation (Portuguese: Formação Itaboraí) is a highly fossiliferous geologic formation and Lagerstätte of the Itaboraí Basin in Rio de Janeiro, southeastern Brazil. The formation reaching a thickness of 100 metres (330 ft) is the defining unit for the Itaboraian South American land mammal age (SALMA), dating to the Early Eocene, approximately 53 to 50 Ma.

The formation is restricted to the Itaboraí Basin, a minibasin of 1 square kilometre (0.39 sq mi) around the city of Itaboraí, 34 kilometres (21 mi) northeast of Rio de Janeiro, and comprises limestones, marls and lignites, deposited in an alluvial to lacustrine environment, dominated by heavy rainfall. The formation overlies Precambrian basement and is overlain by Early Eocene basalts and Late Eocene to Early Oligocene conglomerates.

The up to 100 metres (330 ft) thick formation has provided many fossil mammals of various groups among which the marsupials and related metatherians dominate, birds, snakes, crocodiles, amphibians, and several species of gastropods. Several genera and species were named after the formation; the marsupials Itaboraidelphys camposi and Carolopaulacoutoia itaboraiensis, the birds Itaboravis elaphrocnemoides, Eutreptodactylus itaboraiensis and Eutreptodactylus itaboraiensis, the snake Itaboraiophis depressus and the caiman Eocaiman itaboraiensis and the gastropods Itaborahia lamegoi, Biomphalaria itaboraiensis and Gastrocopta itaboraiensis.

The formation is the richest Cenozoic fossiliferous formation of Brazil, leading to the establishment of the Parque Paleontológico de São José de Itaboraí ("São José de Itaboraí Paleontological Park") in 1995. The site is a candidate for becoming a UNESCO World Heritage Site.

== Etymology ==
The word "Itaboraí" is of Tupi origin, and has two possible etymologies:

- "River of beautiful stones", a combination of the words itá (stone), porã (beautiful) and y (river)
- "River of brilliant stones", derived from the words itá (stone), berab (brilliant) and y (river)

== Description ==
The Itaboraí Formation is restricted to the Itaboraí Basin, a minibasin stretching across an area of 1 square kilometre (0.39 sq mi) of 1,400 by 500 metres (4,600 ft × 1,600 ft), in the vicinity of Itaboraí 34 kilometres (21 mi) northeast of Rio de Janeiro, southeastern Brazil. Between 1933 and 1984, a local cement company exploited the rocks in the area and their workers discovered the first fossil remains in the formation. The now abandoned and largely inaccessible limestone quarries of this locality have yielded a diverse mammalian fauna from early late Paleocene fissure fillings. The sediments of the formation were described by Leinz in 1938. Presently, the basin is filled up with water impeding any collecting activity.

=== Basin history ===
The small basin, a small half-graben, is the oldest and smallest of several Cenozoic rift basins stretching across 1,000 kilometres (620 mi) along a west-southwest to east-northeast trend between the Paraná Basin to the northwest and the Santos Basin to the southeast, separated by the Serra da Mantiqueira and Serra do Mar respectively. This Continental Rift of Southern Brazil (CRSB) comprises the Curitiba, São Paulo, Taubaté, Resende, Volta Redonda, Macacu, Barra de São João and Itaboraí Basins.

An erosional surface, correlated with a 55 Ma sea-level lowstand representing the Paleocene-Eocene transition and associated with magmatism, has been recorded in the various Atlantic marginal basins along the Brazilian coast; Pelotas, Santos, Campos, Espírito Santo, Cumuruxatiba, Jequitinhonha and Mucuri Basins.

=== Stratigraphy ===
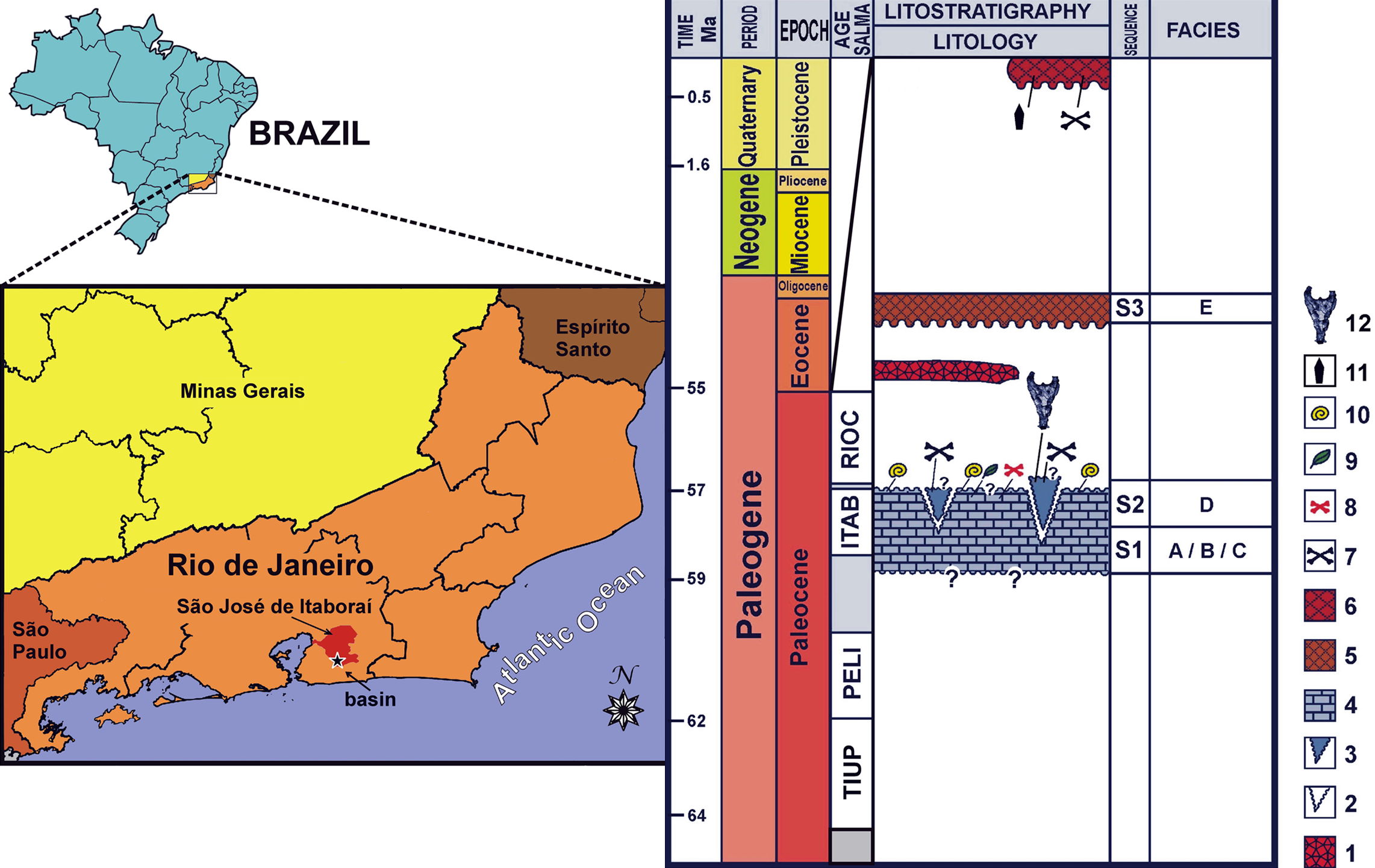
Map and stratigraphic column of the Itaboraí Basin

The Itaboraí Formation rests unconformably on top of the Precambrian Paraíba do Sul Group, part of the Meso- to Neoproterozoic Paraíba do Sul Complex. The Paleogene succession of the minibasin reaches a thickness of 100 metres (330 ft) and consists of three depositional sequences, with the Itaboraí Formation representing the first two;

- Sequence 1 (S1) - clastic limestones with travertine, grey carbonates and oolitic limestones, carbonatic shales and lignites, deposited in a lacustrine environment, originating from debris flows in a tectonic lake. From this sequence gastropods are abundant, while woods, reptiles and mammals are scarce.
- Sequence 2 (S2) - carbonates filling caverns and dissolution cracks on a karstic surface of Sequence 1, comprising fossiliferous marls, deposited in an alluvial to lacustrine environment, transported into these cavities by heavy rains and gravitational flows
- Sequence 3 (S3) - terrestrial siliciclastic sediments, including mudstones, sandstones and sandy conglomerates of Late Eocene to Early Oligocene age, derived from the surrounding basement gneisses, deposited by mudflows in a subaerial alluvial fan environment. These sediments, referred to as the Rio Frio Formation, have been correlated with the Eocene to Oligocene Resende Formation of the eponymous basin.

The Itaboraí Formation is separated from Sequence 3 by basaltic volcanic rocks, formed in the Early Eocene.

Thin section analysis suggests the travertine sequence went through a series of diagenetic processes: firstly, the deposition of the primary carbonate, followed by a set of percolating iron oxide enriched fluids and lastly a set of silica-rich fluids leading to the silica chalcedony and micro-crystalline deposition.

=== Age ===
The formation was deposited during the Early Eocene Climatic Optimum, here indicated as "Eocene hyperthermal"

The Itaboraí Formation, defining the Itaboraian SALMA, was first thought to be early to mid Paleocene in age, until dating performed by Woodburne et al. in 2014 suggested as a more probable early Eocene age (53–50 Ma), spanning polarity chron 23. The overlying basalts have been dated to the Early Eocene (52.6 ± 2.4 Ma). Another very important source of data is palynological analysis of a coal-bearing horizon (lignite) interlayered with alluvial fan deposits at the northern border of the Itaboraí Basin, suggesting a Paleocene to Eocene age. During this time, a biogeographical connection existed with Antarctica and, though separated by the developing South Atlantic, with Africa. The deposits of the formation were formed during the Early Eocene Climatic Optimum (EECO), just after the Paleocene-Eocene Thermal Maximum.

== Paleontological significance ==
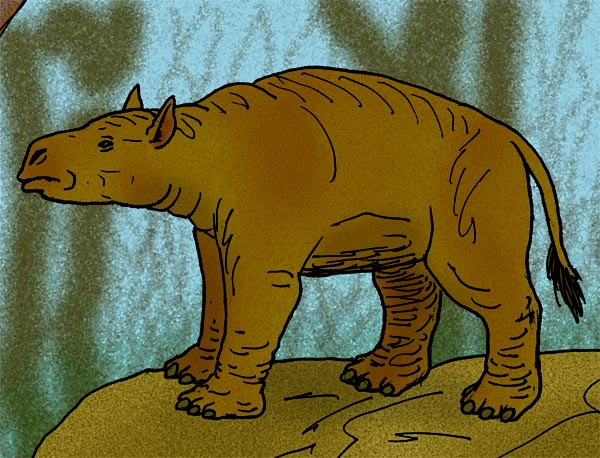
The xenungulate Carodnia comes from the Itaboraí Formation

The Itaboraí Formation is the richest and one of few formations in Brazil providing Paleogene mammal faunas, between the older Tiupampan Maria Farinha Formation of the Parnaíba Basin and the younger Divisaderan Guabirotuba Formation of the Curitiba Basin, the Tinguirirican Entre-Córregos Formation of the Aiuruoca Basin and the Deseadan Tremembé Formation of the Taubaté Basin.

Despite its relatively small size, the São José de Itaboraí Basin comprises a diversified fossil assemblage. Among the groups found there, fossil birds are very rare, mainly due to their pneumatized bones. Only three bird species have been described up to this moment from the Itaboraí Basin. Diogenornis fragilis, a probable ratite ancestor, stands out for its good preservation and the number of specimens preserved. In the Paleocene of the southern hemisphere, small terrestrial birds have only been discovered in the late Paleocene fissure fillings of the Itaboraí Formation.

The relative fossil diversity of the Itaboraí Formation at family level consists of 44% mammals, 23% mollusks, 14% reptiles (lizards, chelonians, crocodyliforms), 7% birds, 5% amphibians and 7% plants. Fish are one of the few groups not found to date in the lacustrine formation. The formation has provided many marsupials and related metatherians. The species Lamegoia conodonta is the largest "condylarth" at Itaboraí and approximates the size of a wolf. Ricardocifellia protocenica, originally described as Paulacoutoia protocenica, is the smallest of the "condylarth" species of Itaboraí, but the most abundant. The most abundant litoptern found in the formation is Protolipterna ellipsodontoides.

Sequence 1 of the formation has provided many land snails, among which several new species. The records of Itaboraí are the oldest for the genera Austrodiscus, Brachypodella, Bulimulus, Cecilioides, Cyclodontina, Eoborus, Gastrocopta, Leiostracus, Plagiodontes and Temesa. Also, the formation contains the oldest record for the families Orthalicidae, Gastrocoptidae, Ferussaciidae and Strophocheilidae.

Several genera and species were named after the formation; the marsupials Itaboraidelphys camposi and Carolopaulacoutoia itaboraiensis, the birds Itaboravis elaphrocnemoides, Eutreptodactylus itaboraiensis and Eutreptodactylus itaboraiensis, the snake Itaboraiophis depressus and crocodile Eocaiman itaboraiensis and the gastropods Itaborahia lamegoi, Biomphalaria itaboraiensis and Gastrocopta itaboraiensis.

Because of its paleontological importance, the Itaboraí Basin area was designated as a paleontological park in 1995: Parque Paleontológico de São José de Itaboraí ("São José de Itaboraí Paleontological Park"). The park was established to preserve the geology and highlight the importance of the paleontological richness of the area.

The formation is named as one of the fossil sites of potential World Heritage Value by the IUCN in 1996.

=== Fossil content ===
Fossils recovered from the formation include:

Class	Group	Fossils	Images	Notes
Mammals	Marsupials	Bergqvistherium primigenia		
Mammals	Marsupials	Carolocoutoia ferigoloi		
Mammals	Marsupials	Carolopaulacoutoia itaboraiensis		
Mammals	Marsupials	Derorhynchus singularis		
Mammals	Marsupials	Didelphopsis cabrerai		
Mammals	Marsupials	Eobrasilia coutoi		
Mammals	Marsupials	Gashternia carioca		
Mammals	Marsupials	Gaylordia macrocynodonta		
Mammals	Marsupials	Gaylordia mater		
Mammals	Marsupials	Guggenheimia brasiliensis		
Mammals	Marsupials	Guggenheimia crocheti		
Mammals	Marsupials	Itaboraidelphys camposi		
Mammals	Marsupials	Marmosopsis juradoi		
Mammals	Marsupials	Minusculodelphis minimus		
Mammals	Marsupials	Minusculodelphis modicum		
Mammals	Marsupials	Mirandatherium alipioi		
Mammals	Marsupials	Monodelphopsis travassosi		
Mammals	Marsupials	Periprotodidelphis bergqvistae		
Mammals	Marsupials	Protodidelphis mastodontoides		
Mammals	Marsupials	Protodidelphis vanzolinii		
Mammals	Marsupials	Riolestes capricornicus		
Mammals	Marsupials	Xenodelphis doelloi		
Mammals	Marsupials	Australidelphia indet., Didelphidae indet., Didolodontidae indet., Microbiotheriidae indet., Paucituberculata indet., Pediomyidae indet., Protodidelphidae indet.		
Mammals	Hatcheriformes	Zeusdelphys complicatus		
Mammals	Non-Marsupial Metatheria	Austropediomys marshalli		
Mammals	Non-Marsupial Metatheria	Herpetotheriidae indet.		
Mammals	Non-Marsupial Metatheria	Peradectidae indet.		
Mammals	Armadillos	Riostegotherium yanei		
Mammals	Astrapotheres	Tetragonostylops apthomasi		
Mammals	Didolodontidae	Lamegoia conodonta		
Mammals	Didolodontidae	Ricardocifellia protocenica syn. Paulacoutoia protocenica		
Mammals	Litopterns	Asmithwoodwardia scotti		
Mammals	Litopterns	Miguelsoria parayirunhor		
Mammals	Litopterns	Paranisolambda prodromus		
Mammals	Litopterns	Protolipterna ellipsodontoides		
Mammals	Litopterns	Victorlemoinea prototypica		
Mammals	Notoungulata	Camargomendesia pristina		
Mammals	Notoungulata	Colbertia magellanica		
Mammals	Notoungulata	Homalostylops atavus		
Mammals	Notoungulata	Henricosbornia sp.		
Mammals	Notoungulata	Itaboraitemnus macrodon		
Mammals	Notoungulata	Nanolophodon tutuca		
Mammals	Notoungulata	Notoungulata indet.		
Mammals	Sparassodonts	Palaeocladosictis mosesi		
Mammals	Sparassodonts	Patene simpsoni		
Mammals	Sparassodonts	?Arminiheringia sp.		
Mammals	Sparassodonts	Hathlyacininae indet.		
Mammals	Sparassodonts	Borhyaenidae indet.		
Mammals	Polydolopimorphia	Bobbschaefferia fluminensis		
Mammals	Polydolopimorphia	Epidolops ameghinoi		
Mammals	Polydolopimorphia	Polydolopidae indet.		
Mammals	Simpsonitheria	Procaroloameghinia pricei		
Mammals	Xenungulata	Carodnia vieirai		
Birds	Rheidae	Diogenornis fragilis		
Birds	Cuculidae	Eutreptodactylus itaboraiensis		
Birds	Cariamae	Itaboravis elaphrocnemoides		
Birds	Psilopteridae	Paleopsilopterus itaboraiensis		
Snakes	Aniliidae	Hoffstetterella brasiliensis		
Snakes	Aniliidae	Coniophis cf. precedens		
Snakes	Boidae	Corallus priscus		
Snakes	Boidae	Hechtophis austrinus		
Snakes	Boidae	Itaboraiophis depressus		
Snakes	Boidae	Paraungaliophis pricei		
Snakes	Boidae	Paulacoutophis perplexus		
Snakes	Boidae	Waincophis cameratus		
Snakes	Boidae	Waincophis pressulus		
Snakes	Madtsoiidae	Madtsoia camposi		
Snakes	Russellophiidae	?Russellophiidae indet.		
Crocodyliforms	Crocodiles	Sahitisuchus fluminensis		
Crocodyliforms	Crocodiles	Eocaiman itaboraiensis		
Amphibians	Caecilians	Apodops pricei		
Amphibians	Frogs	Xenopus romeri		
Mollusks	Gastropods	Austrodiscus lopesi		
Mollusks	Gastropods	Biomphalaria itaboraiensis		
Mollusks	Gastropods	"Brachypodella" britoi		
Mollusks	Gastropods	Brasilennea arethusae		
Mollusks	Gastropods	Brasilennea guttula		
Mollusks	Gastropods	Brasilennea minor		
Mollusks	Gastropods	Bulimulus fazendicus		
Mollusks	Gastropods	Bulimulus trindadeae		
Mollusks	Gastropods	Cecilioides sommeri		
Mollusks	Gastropods	Cortana carvalhoi		
Mollusks	Gastropods	Cyclodontina coelhoi		
Mollusks	Gastropods	Eoborus fusiforme		
Mollusks	Gastropods	Eoborus rotundus		
Mollusks	Gastropods	Eoborus sanctijosephi		
Mollusks	Gastropods	Gastrocopta itaboraiensis		
Mollusks	Gastropods	Gastrocopta mezzalirai		
Mollusks	Gastropods	Itaborahia lamegoi		
Mollusks	Gastropods	Leiostracus ferreirai		
Mollusks	Gastropods	Plagiodontes aff. dentatus		
Mollusks	Gastropods	Temesa magalhaesi		
Mollusks	Gastropods	Strophocheilus sp.		
Flora	Pollen	Echitricolpites polaris, Foveotriletes margaritae, Verrutriporites lunduensis		

== Itaboraian correlations ==
Itaboraian correlations in South America
Formation	Itaboraí	Las Flores	Koluel Kaike	Maíz Gordo	Muñani	Mogollón	Bogotá	Cerrejón	Ypresian (IUCS) • Wasatchian (NALMA) Bumbanian (ALMA) • Mangaorapan (NZ)
Basin	Itaboraí	Golfo San Jorge		Salta	Altiplano Basin	Talara & Tumbes	Altiplano Cundiboyacense	Cesar-Ranchería	Itaboraí Formation (South America)
Country	Brazil	Argentina			Peru		Colombia		Itaboraí Formation (South America)
Carodnia									Itaboraí Formation (South America)
Gashternia									Itaboraí Formation (South America)
Henricosbornia									Itaboraí Formation (South America)
Victorlemoinea									Itaboraí Formation (South America)
Polydolopimorphia									Itaboraí Formation (South America)
Birds									Itaboraí Formation (South America)
Reptiles									Itaboraí Formation (South America)
Fish									Itaboraí Formation (South America)
Flora									Itaboraí Formation (South America)
Environments	Alluvial-lacustrine	Alluvial-fluvial		Fluvio-lacustrine	Lacustrine	Fluvial	Fluvio-deltaic		Itaboraian volcanoclastics Itaboraian fauna Itaboraian flora
Volcanic			Yes						Itaboraian volcanoclastics Itaboraian fauna Itaboraian flora

== See also ==
- South American land mammal ages
- Iguape Formation, contemporaneous formation of the Santos Basin
- Laguna del Hunco Formation, contemporaneous fossiliferous formation of the Cañadón Asfalto Basin, Argentina
- Lefipan Formation, pre-Tiupampan fossiliferous lacustrine formation of the Cañadón Asfalto Basin, Argentina
- Bogotá Formation, contemporaneous fossiliferous formation of central Colombia
- Green River Formation, contemporaneous fossiliferous formation of Colorado, Wyoming and Utah
- Klondike Mountain Formation, contemporaneous fossiliferous formation of Washington State
- La Meseta Formation, contemporaneous fossiliferous formation of Antarctica
