= Itaboraian =

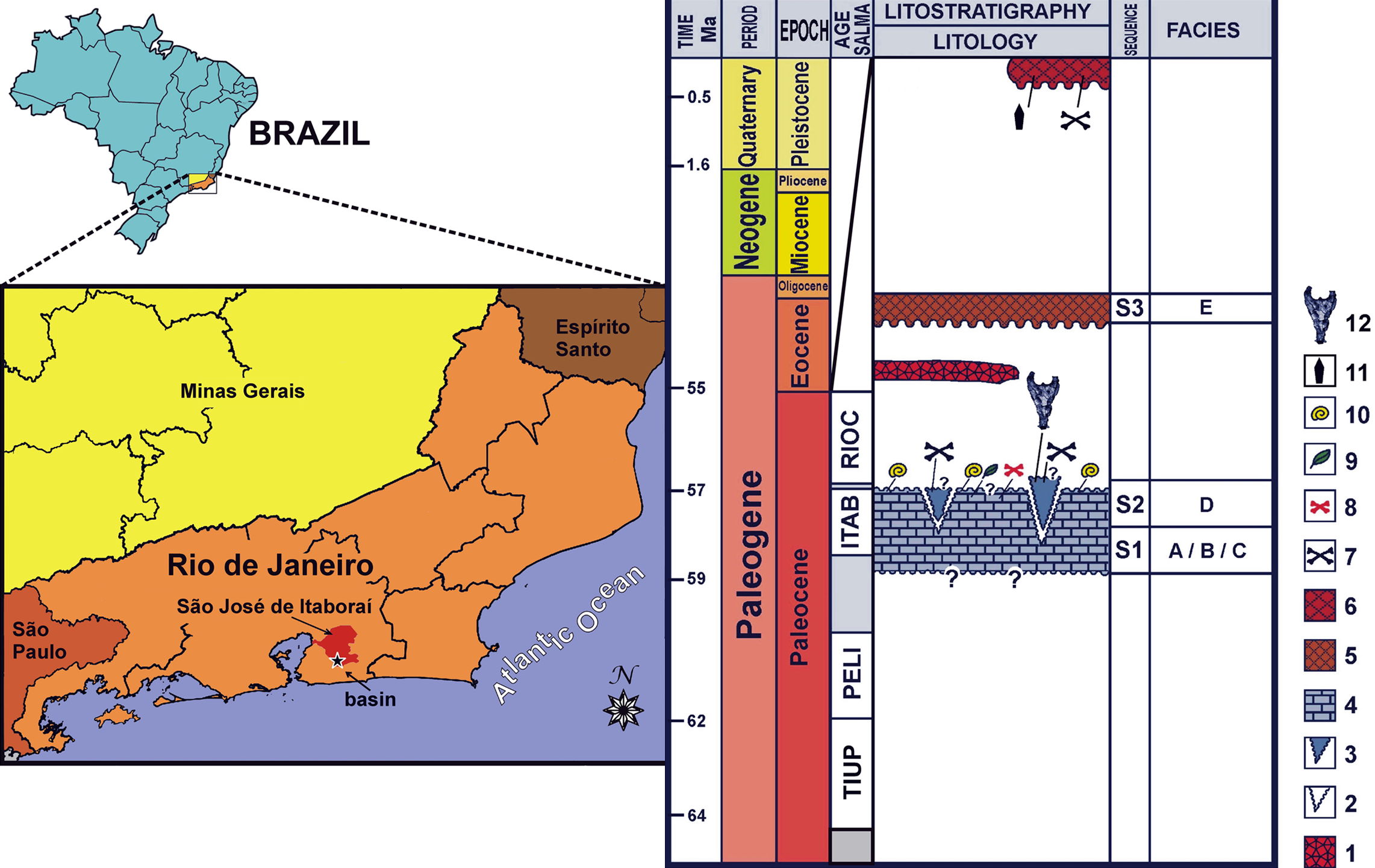
Stratigraphy and location of the Itaboraí Basin. Crocodile skull indicates Sahitisuchus find.

The Itaboraian (Portuguese: Itaboraiense) age is a period within the Early Eocene geologic time (53.0–50.0 Ma) epoch of the Paleogene, used more specifically with South American land mammal ages (SALMA). It follows the Riochican and precedes the Casamayoran age.

== Etymology ==
This age is named after the Itaboraí Formation in the Itaboraí Basin in Itaboraí, a Greater Rio municipality in the state of Rio de Janeiro in Brazil not very far away from Niterói.

== Formations ==
Locations of Itaboraian formations

Formation bold is type	Country	Basin	Notes
Itaboraí Formation	Brazil	Itaboraí Basin	
Bogotá Formation	Colombia	Altiplano Cundiboyacense	
Cerrejón Formation	Colombia	Cesar-Ranchería Basin	
Chota Formation	Peru	Bagua Basin	
Koluel Kaike Formation	Argentina	Golfo San Jorge Basin	
Las Flores Formation	Argentina	Golfo San Jorge Basin	
Maíz Gordo Formation	Argentina	Salta Basin	
Mogollón Formation	Peru	Talara & Tumbes Basins	
Muñani Formation	Peru	Altiplano Basin	

== Fossils ==
Group	Fossils	Formation	Notes
Mammals	Asmithwoodwardia scotti, Austropediomys marshalli, Bergqvistherium primigenia, Bobbschaefferia fluminensis, Camargomendesia pristina, Carodnia vieirai, Carolocoutoia ferigoloi, Carolopaulacoutoia itaboraiensis, Colbertia magellanica, Derorhynchus singularis, Didelphopsis cabrerai, Eobrasilia coutoi, Epidolops ameghinoi, Gashternia carioca, Gaylordia macrocynodonta, Gaylordia mater, Guggenheimia brasiliensis, Guggenheimia crocheti, Homalostylops atavus, Itaboraidelphys camposi, Lamegoia conodonta, Marmosopsis juradoi, Miguelsoria parayirunhor, Minusculodelphis minimus, M. modicum, Mirandatherium alipioi, Monodelphopsis travassosi, Palaeocladosictis mosesi, Paranisolambda prodromus, Patene simpsoni, Periprotodidelphis bergqvistae, Procaroloameghinia pricei, Protodidelphis mastodontoides, P. vanzolinii, Protolipterna ellipsodontoides, Ricardocifellia protocenica, Riolestes capricornicus, Riostegotherium yanei, Tetragonostylops apthomasi, Victorlemoinea prototypica, Xenodelphis doelloi, Zeusdelphys complicatus, ?Arminiheringia sp., Henricosbornia sp., Australidelphia indet., Borhyaenidae indet., Didelphidae indet., Didolodontidae indet., Herpetotheriidae indet., Microbiotheriidae indet., Notoungulata indet., Paucituberculata indet., Pediomyidae indet., Peradectidae indet., Polydolopidae indet., Protodidelphidae indet.	Itaboraí	
Mammals	Ernestokokenia yirunhor, Gashternia ctalehor, Henricosbornia waitehor, Seudenius cteronc, Shecenia ctirneru, ?Isotemnus ctalego, ?Peripantostylops orehor, ?Polydolops kamektsen, Kibenikhoria sp., Archaeopithecidae indet., Borhyaenidae indet., ?Litopterna indet., ?Notostylopidae indet.	Koluel Kaike	
Mammals	Anisolambda sp., Antepithecus sp., Asmithwoodwardia sp., Bardalestes sp., Bobbschaefferia sp., Camargomendesia sp., Carolopaulacoutoia sp., Colbertia sp., Derorhynchus sp., Didelphopsis sp., Epidolops sp., Ernestokokenia sp., Gashternia sp., Guggenheimia crocheti, Henricosbornia sp., Isotemnus sp., Itaboraitherium sp., Kibenikhoria sp., Marmosopsis sp., Mirandatherium sp., Monodelphopsis sp., Peripantostylops sp., Polydolops sp., Procaroloameghinia pricei, Protodidelphis sp., Shecenia sp., Trigonostylops sp., Victorlemoinea sp., Woodburnodon sp., Ceratodontidae indet., ?Patene indet.	Las Flores	
Mammals	Carodnia inexpectans	Mogollón	
Mammals	Chulpasia mattaueri, Peradectes austrinum, Perutherium altiplanense, Sillustania quechuense, Umayodus raimondi, Didelphidae indet., ?Didolodontidae indet., Notoungulata sp., Pediomyidae indet., Proteutheria indet.	Muñani	
Birds	Diogenornis fragilis, Eutreptodactylus itaboraiensis, Itaboravis elaphrocnemoides, Paleopsilopterus itaboraiensis	Itaboraí	
Birds	Latidae indet., Siluriformes indet., Tetragonopterinae indet.	Muñani	
Reptiles & amphibians	Acherontisuchus guajiraensis, Anthracosuchus balrogus, Carbonemys cofrinii, Cerrejonemys wayuunaiki, Cerrejonisuchus improcerus, Pelomedusoides sp., Puentemys mushaisaensis, Titanoboa cerrejonensis	Cerrejón	
Reptiles & amphibians	?Madtsoia sp.	Koluel Kaike	
Reptiles & amphibians	Notocaiman stromeri	Peñas; Coloradas	
Reptiles & amphibians	Bretesuchus bonapartei	Maíz Gordo	
Reptiles & amphibians	Apodops pricei, Coniophis cf. precedens, Corallus priscus, Hechtophis austrinus, Hoffstetterella brasiliensis, Itaboraiophis depressus, Madtsoia camposi, Paraungaliophis pricei, Paulacoutophis perplexus, Sahitisuchus fluminensis, Waincophis cameratus, Waincophis pressulus, Xenopus romeri, ? Russellophiidae indet.	Itaboraí	
Reptiles & amphibians	Lorosuchus nodosus, Pelomedusoides cf. argentinensis	Río Loro	
Reptiles & amphibians	cf. Coniophis sp., ?Roxochelys vilavilensis, Crocodylia indet., ?Leptodactylidae indet.	Muñani	
Fishes	Dipnoi sp., Elopomorpha sp.	Cerrejón	
Fishes	Lepidosiren cf. paradoxa, Ceratodus sp.	Muñani	
Molluscs	Bulimulus fazendicus	Itaboraí	
Flora	Menispina evidens	Bogotá	
Flora	Stephania palaeosudamericana	Bogotá, Cerrejón	
Flora	Malvaciphyllum macondicus, Petrocardium cerrejonense, Petrocardium wayuuorum	Cerrejón	

== Correlations ==
Itaboraian correlations in South America
Formation	Itaboraí	Las Flores	Koluel Kaike	Maíz Gordo	Muñani	Mogollón	Bogotá	Cerrejón	Ypresian (IUCS) • Wasatchian (NALMA) Bumbanian (ALMA) • Mangaorapan (NZ)
Basin	Itaboraí	Golfo San Jorge		Salta	Altiplano Basin	Talara & Tumbes	Altiplano Cundiboyacense	Cesar-Ranchería	Itaboraian (South America)
Country	Brazil	Argentina			Peru		Colombia		Itaboraian (South America)
Carodnia									Itaboraian (South America)
Gashternia									Itaboraian (South America)
Henricosbornia									Itaboraian (South America)
Victorlemoinea									Itaboraian (South America)
Polydolopimorphia									Itaboraian (South America)
Birds									Itaboraian (South America)
Reptiles									Itaboraian (South America)
Fish									Itaboraian (South America)
Flora									Itaboraian (South America)
Environments	Alluvial-lacustrine	Alluvial-fluvial		Fluvio-lacustrine	Lacustrine	Fluvial	Fluvio-deltaic		Itaboraian volcanoclastics Itaboraian fauna Itaboraian flora
Volcanic			Yes						Itaboraian volcanoclastics Itaboraian fauna Itaboraian flora
