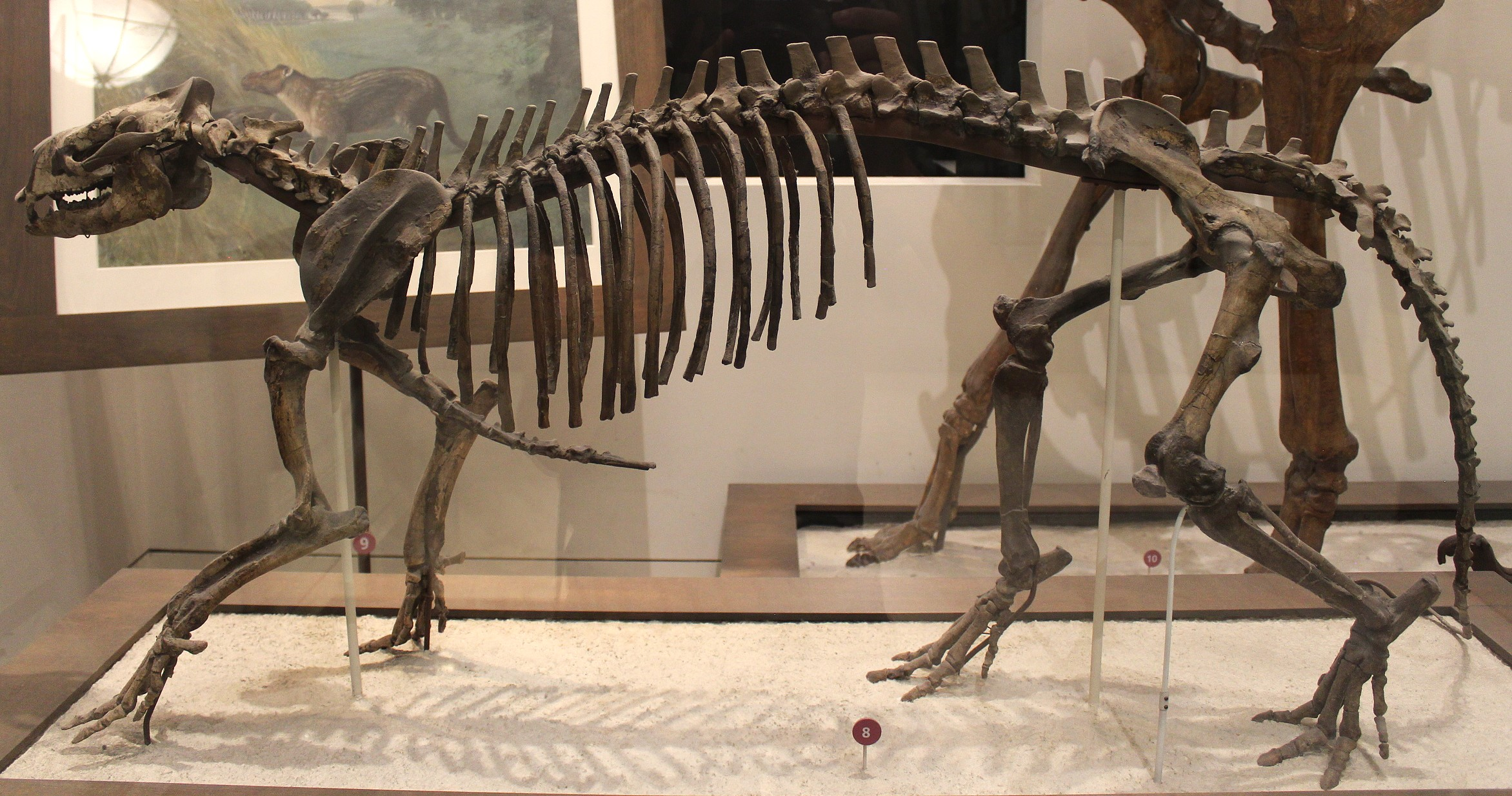
- P. primaevus at the AMNH, collected from Bighorn Basin, Wyoming.

Scientific classification
- Kingdom: Animalia
- Phylum: Chordata
- Class: Mammalia
- Infraclass: Placentalia
- Family: †Phenacodontidae
- Subfamily: †Phenacodontinae
- Genus: †Phenacodus; Cope, 1873

Species
- †P. bisonensis; †P. condali; †P. grangeri; †P. intermedius; †P. lemoinei; †P. magnus; †P. matthewi; †P. primaevus (type species); †P. teilhardi; †P. trilobatus; †P. vortmani

Synonyms
- Trispondylus Cope, 1884

= Phenacodus =

Phenacodus Temporal range: Late Paleocene–Middle Eocene

Genus of mammals (fossil)

Phenacodus (Greek: "deception" (phenax), "tooth' (odus)) is an extinct genus of mammals from the late Paleocene through middle Eocene, about 55 million years ago. It is one of the earliest and most primitive of the ungulates, typifying the family Phenacodontidae and the order Perissodactyla.

== Description ==
=== Crania ===
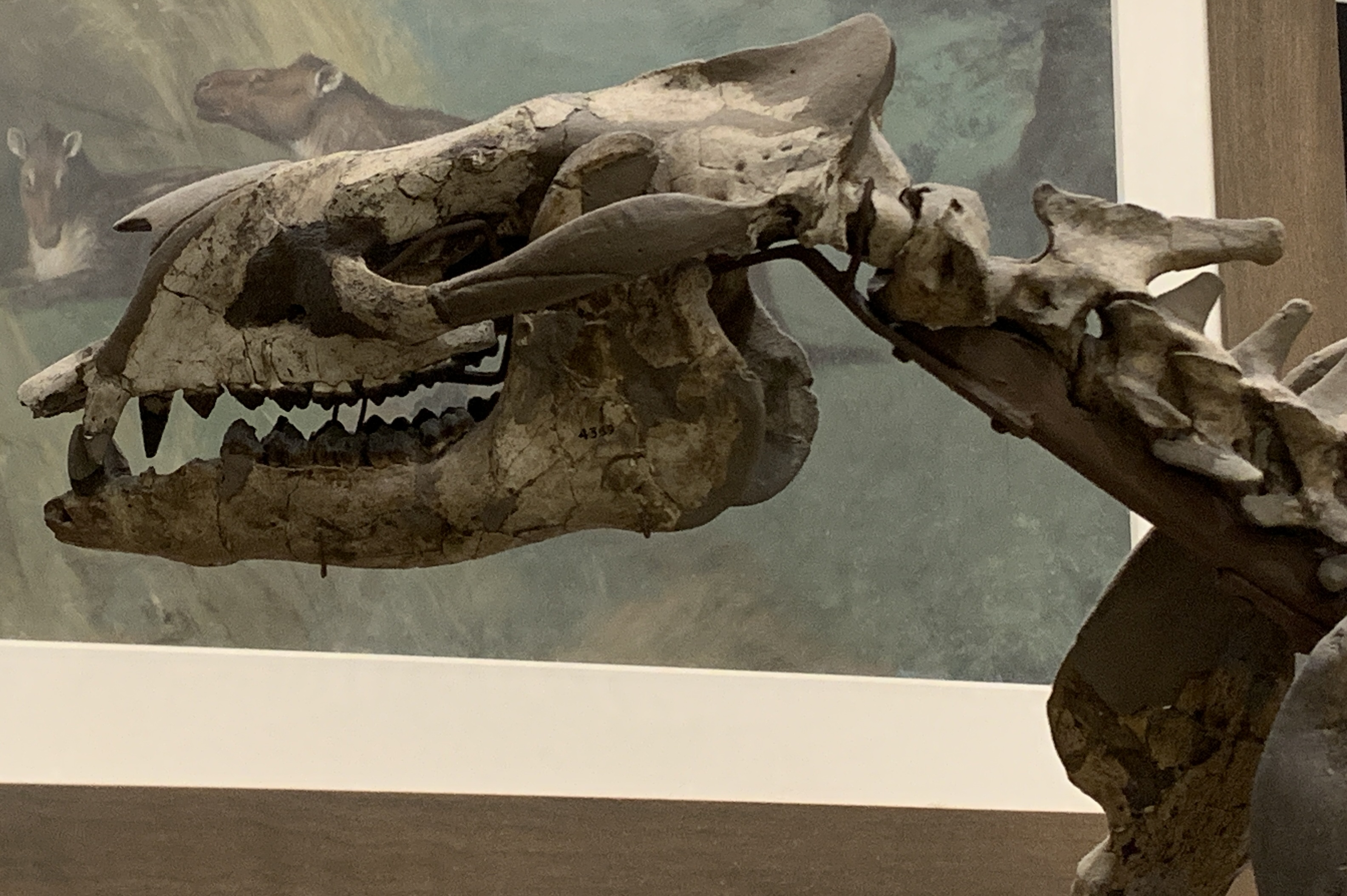
P. primaevus, closeup of skull.

The skull was small, with proportionately minute brain; and the arched back, strong lumbar vertebrae, long and powerful tail, and comparatively feeble fore-quarters all proclaim kinship with the primitive carnivores Creodonta. The skull bore a saggital crest. All the bones of the limbs are separate, and those of the carpus and tarsus do not alternate - each one in the upper row is placed immediately above the corresponding one in the row below. The full series of forty-four teeth was developed; and the upper molars were short-crowned, or brachyodont, with six low cusps, two internal, two intermediate and two external, so that they were of the typical primitive bunodont structure. The dental formula is 3,1,4,33,1,4,3 × 2 = 44.

=== Postcrania ===
Phenacodus intermedius reached 10 to 39 kg (22 to 86 lb), while P. trilobatus is estimated at 22 to 87 kg (49 to 192 lb). The typical Phenacodus primaevus was a relatively small ungulate about 1.5 m (4 ft 11 in) long and weighed up to 56 kg (123 lb), of slight build, with straight limbs each terminating in five complete toes, and walking in the digitigrade fashion of the modern horse. The middle toe was the largest, and the weight of the body was mainly supported on this and the two adjoining digits, which appear to have been encased in hooves, foreshadowing the tridactyl type common in perissodactyls and certain extinct groups of ungulates.

=== Paleoecology ===
In habits, the animal was cursorial and herbivorous, or possibly carnivorous. In the early Paleocene of North America, the place of the above species was taken by Tetraclaenodon puercensis, an animal only half the size of P. primaevus, with the terminal joints of the limbs intermediate between hoofs and claws, and the first and fifth toes taking their full share in the support of the weight of the body. These two genera may be regarded as forming the earliest stages in the evolution of the horse, coming below Hyracotherium (see Equidae).

As ancestors of the artiodactyl section of the Ungulata, we may look to forms more or less closely related to the North American Lower Eocene genus Mioclaenus, typifying the family Mioclaenidae. The species of Mioclaenus were five-toed, bunodont Condylarthra, with a decided approximation to the perissodactyl type in the structure of the feet. A second type of Condylarthra from the North American Lower Eocene is represented by the family Meniscotheriidae, including the genus Meniscotherium.

A 2014 cladistic analysis places both Phenacodus and Meniscotherium within stem perissodactyls.

== Phylogeny ==
Cladogram after Gelfo and Sigé, 2011:

- - Protungulatum
  - - Phenacodus
    - Kollpaniinae
      - Simoclaenus
      - - Molinodus
        - - Tiuclaenus
          - - Andinodus
            - Pucanodus
    - Didolodontidae
      - Paulacoutoia
      - Lamegoia
      - Paulogervaisia
      - Didolodus
      - Ernestokokenia
      - - Escribania chubutensis
        - - Escribania talonicuspis
          - - Raulvaccia
            - Umayodus

== Gallery ==
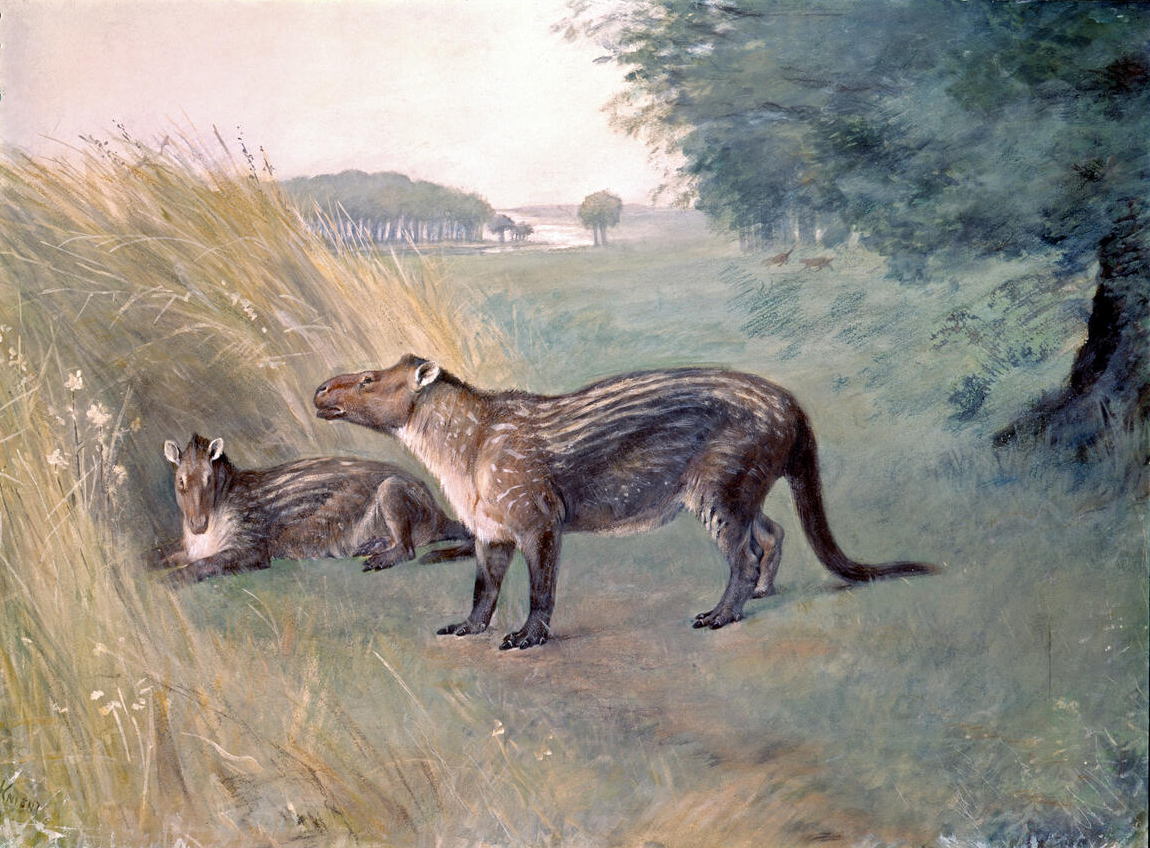
Restoration by Charles R. Knight

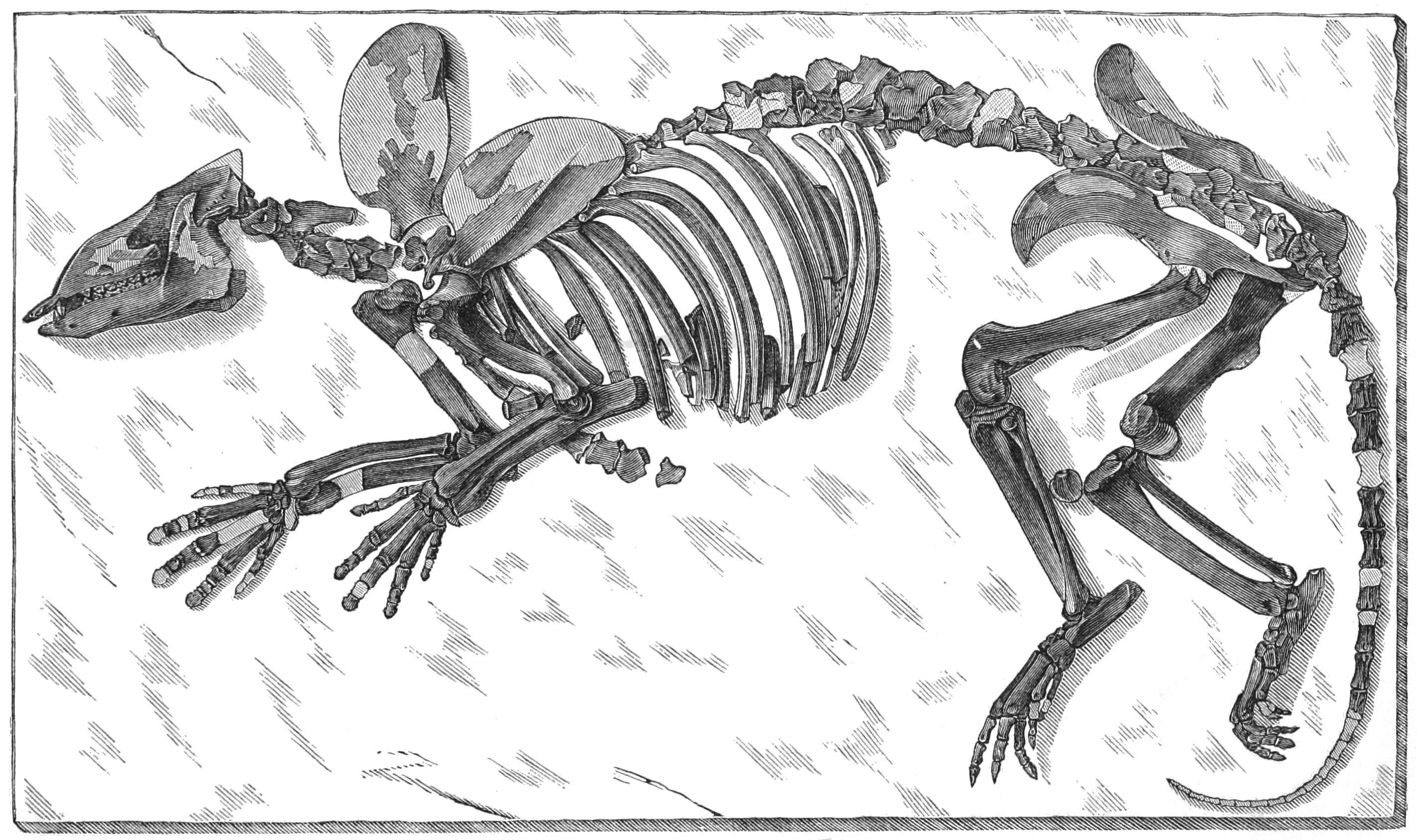
Skeleton of Phenacodus primaevus

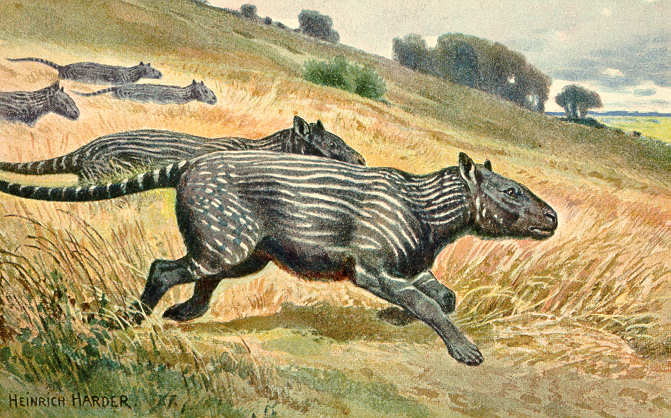
Restoration by Heinrich Harder

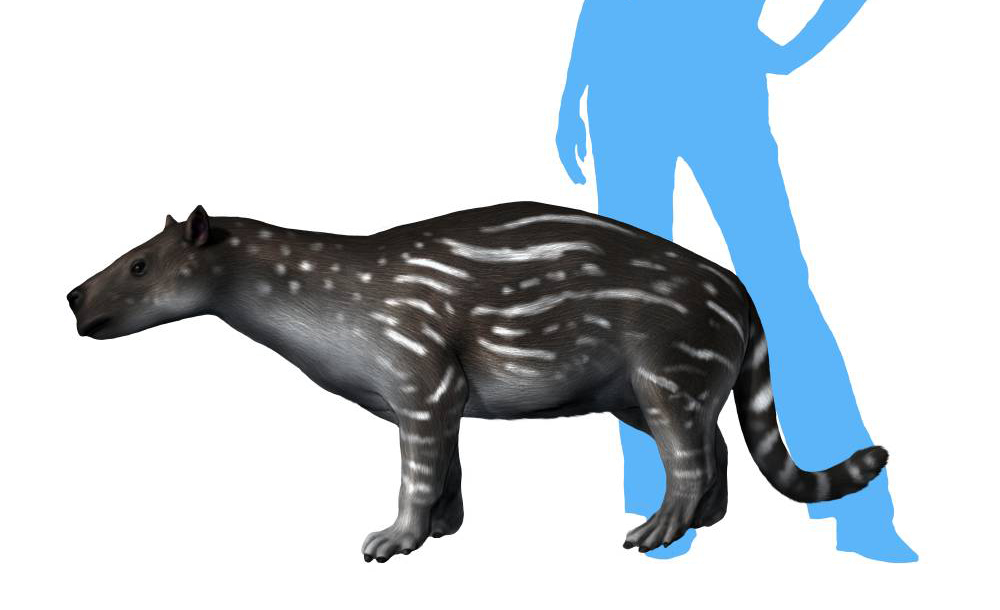
Comparison of P. primaevus with a human
