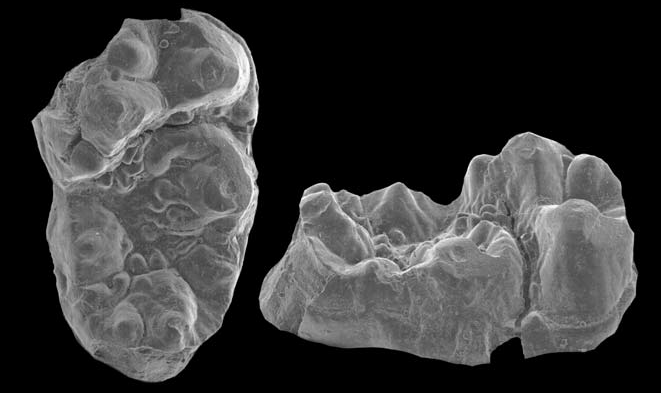
- Tooth of Umayodus

Scientific classification
- Kingdom: Animalia
- Phylum: Chordata
- Class: Mammalia
- Infraclass: Placentalia
- Family: †Didolodontidae
- Genus: †Umayodus; Gelfo & Sigé, 2011
- Species: †U. raimondi

Binomial name
- †Umayodus raimondi Gelfo & Sigé, 2011

= Umayodus =

Umayodus Temporal range: Late Paleocene-Early Eocene (Itaboraian-Casamayoran) ~58.7–48.6 Ma

Extinct genus of mammals

Umayodus is an extinct genus of "condylarth" mammal from the late Paleocene to the early Eocene. It is a didolodontid that lived in what is now Peru. It is known from the holotype LU3-801, an isolated right third molar, which was found in the Muñani Formation of Laguna Umayo, Peru. It was first named by Javier N. Gelfo and Bernard Sigé in 2011, and the type species is Umayodus raimondi.

== Phylogeny ==
Cladogram after Gelfo and Sigé, 2011:

- - Protungulatum
  - - Phenacodus
    - Kollpaniinae
      - Simoclaenus
      - - Molinodus
        - - Tiuclaenus
          - - Andinodus
            - Pucanodus
    - Didolodontidae
      - Paulacoutoia
      - Lamegoia
      - Paulogervaisia
      - Didolodus
      - Ernestokokenia
      - - Escribania chubutensis
        - - Escribania talonicuspis
          - - Raulvaccia
            - Umayodus
