= Bahiensis priscus =

Scientific classification
- Kingdom: Animalia
- Phylum: Mollusca
- Class: Gastropoda
- Order: Stylommatophora
- Family: Cyclodontinidae
- Genus: Bahiensis
- Species: †B. priscus

Binomial name
- †Bahiensis priscus (Wood, 1828)

Species of gastropod

Bahiensis priscus is an extinct species of small to medium-sized air-breathing land snail, terrestrial pulmonate gastropods in the family Cyclodontinidae.

== Distribution ==
Fossils of this species were found in Paleocene strata in Uruguay.
