= P. dentatus =

P. dentatus may refer to:

- Paralichthys dentatus, the summer flounder, a flatfish species
- Plagiodontes dentatus, an extinct land snail species
- Polyptychus dentatus, a moth species
