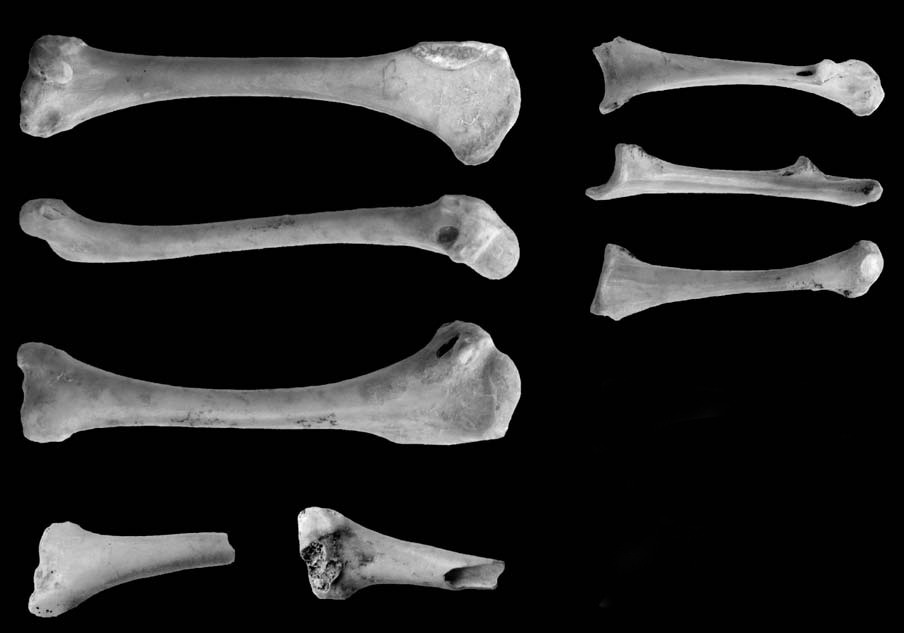
- Coracoid and humerus

Scientific classification
- Kingdom: Animalia
- Phylum: Chordata
- Class: Aves
- Order: Cariamiformes
- Genus: †Itaboravis; Mayr et al. 2011

Type species
- †Itaboravis elaphrocnemoides Mayr et al. 2011

= Itaboravis =

Itaboravis Temporal range: Early Eocene (Itaboraian) ~53–50 Ma

Extinct genus of birds

Itaboravis is an extinct genus of land birds uncovered from the Early Eocene Itaboraí Formation of São José do Itaboraí, Rio de Janeiro state, Brazil. Based on analysis of a coracoid and two humeri it was tentatively assigned to Cariamae (=Cariamiformes), due to similarities with Elaphrocnemus, but some morphological similarities of the humerus to the palaeognathous family Tinamidae were also noted.
