= Saltaodus =

Saltaodus Temporal range: Late Eocene ~37–34 Ma

Scientific classification
- Domain: Eukaryota
- Kingdom: Animalia
- Phylum: Chordata
- Class: Mammalia
- Family: †Didolodontidae
- Genus: †Saltaodus; Gelfo et al 2020

Type species
- Saltaodus sirolli Gelfo et al, 2020

Species
- S. sirolli Gelfo et al 2020

Extinct genus of mammals

Saltaodus is an extinct genus of mammals, belonging to the family Didolodontidae. It lived during the Late Eocene, in what is now South America.

== Description ==
This genus is only known from a left mandible, making it impossible to reconstruct its overall appearance. It is assumed to have been a small sized animal, and comparison with its better known relative Didolodus indicates that Saltaodus must have weighed less than five kilograms. It was characterized by the presence of a well developed canine and a brachydont dentition. The first and second lower premolars were single rooted. Compared to the Kollpaniidae, another group of archaic South American mammals, Saltaodus had taller and more separated cusps, with a well developed cristid. The basin of the talonids was large and wasn't filled by the base of the hypoconid or by the distal wall of the metaconid. The fourth lower premolar was distinctly similar to a molar.

== Classification ==
Saltaodus was a member of the Didolodontidae, an enigmatic clade of south american ungulates, who lived during the beginning of the Cenozoic, perhaps close to the ancestor of Litopterna. Saltaodus was one of the smallest known didolodontids, and one of the few known from the low latitudes of South America.

Saltaodus sirolli was first described in 2020, based on fossils found in the Lumbrera Formation, near San Antonio de los Cobres, in the Salta Province of Argentina.
