= Temesa =

Temesa can refer to:

- Temesa (ancient city), an ancient city in Magna Graecia
- Temesa (gastropod), an extinct genus of land snails
