= Elaphrocnemus =

Elaphrocnemus Temporal range: 44–28 Ma Middle Eocene to Late Oligocene

Scientific classification
- Kingdom: Animalia
- Phylum: Chordata
- Class: Aves
- Order: Cariamiformes
- Family: incertae sedis
- Genus: †Elaphrocnemus

Type species
- †Elaphrocnemus phasianus Milne-Edwards, 1891

Species
- †Elaphrocnemus crex; †Elaphrocnemus phasianus; †Elaphrocnemus brodkorbi

Synonyms
- Filholornis Milne-Edwards, 1891; ?Talantatos Reichenbach, 1852

Extinct genus of birds

Elaphrocnemus is a genus of extinct bird from the Eocene and Oligocene periods of Europe. Part of Cariamiformes, its closest living relatives are seriemas, though it differs significantly from them, being a better flyer.

== Classification ==
Since its original description Elaphrocnemus has been regarded as a cariamiform bird. It was referred to the family Orthocnemidae, since them absorbed into Idiornithidae. However, relationships within Cariamiformes are unresolved, as several studies render Idiornithidae as polyphyletic, with Elaphrocnemus recovered away from other "idiornithids", outside of the clade leading to them and modern seriemas.

Some authorities renders the genus a synonym of Talantatos, though some recent studies recover it as independent from this genus.

A possibly closely related species, Itaboravis, is known from the Paleocene of Brazil.

== Flight capacities ==
Unlike its poorly-flighted modern seriema relatives, and the several flightless extinct Cariamiformes like phorusrhacids and bathornithids, Elaphrocnemus appears to have been a good flyer. It possesses long scapulas, convergent in shape to those of pelicans, and although its furcula was as weakly developed as that of modern seriemas and their flightless relatives it had proportionally large and strong wing bone elements. Likewise, its legs were also shorter than those of other Cariamiformes, implying a less cursorial lifestyle.

Because Cariamiformes had a more or less global distribution across the Paleogene, the flight capacities of Elaphrocnemus and kin might be of extreme relevance to the biogeographical distribution of the clade.

== Palaeoecology ==
Elaphrocnemus is one of the most common birds in sites like the Quercy Formation, perhaps indicating agglomeration in large flocks. The local climate was subtropical in nature, producing a rich rainforest ecosystem that included a large variety of mammal and bird species.
