= Apodops =

Apodops Temporal range: Early Eocene (Itaboraian) ~53–50 Ma

Scientific classification
- Kingdom: Animalia
- Phylum: Chordata
- Class: Amphibia
- Order: Gymnophiona
- Clade: Apoda
- Family: Caeciliidae
- Genus: †Apodops; Estes & Wake 1972

Type species
- Apodops pricei Estes & Wake 1972

Extinct genus of caecilians

Apodops is an extinct genus of early caecilians from the Early Eocene Itaboraí Formation of Brazil. The type species of the genus is A. pricei, described based on an isolated and broken trunk vertebra.
