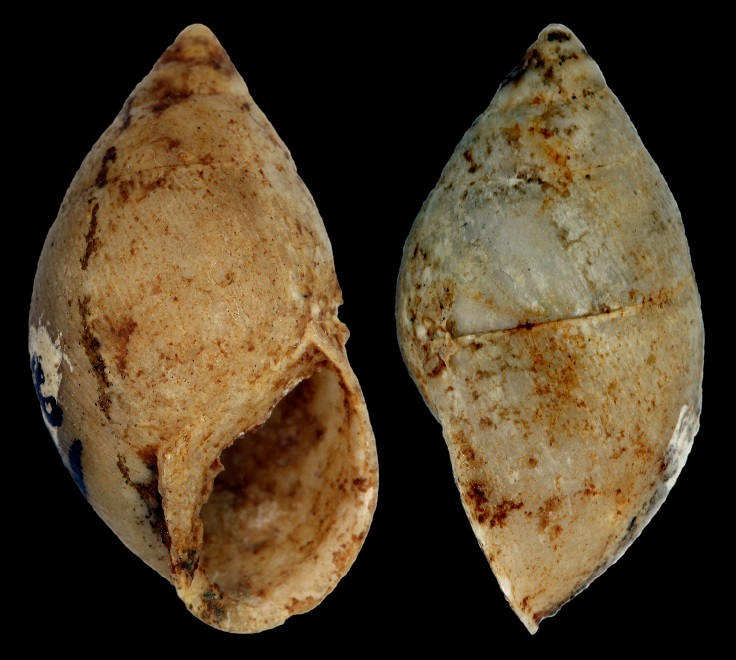
- Two views of a fossil shell of Eoborus fusiforme

Scientific classification
- Kingdom: Animalia
- Phylum: Mollusca
- Class: Gastropoda
- Order: Stylommatophora
- Family: Strophocheilidae
- Genus: †Eoborus
- Species: †E. fusiforme

Binomial name
- †Eoborus fusiforme Salvador & Simone, 2013

= Eoborus fusiforme =

Eoborus fusiforme Temporal range: Paleocene

Extinct species of gastropod

Eoborus fusiforme is a fossil species of air-breathing land snail, a terrestrial pulmonate gastropod mollusc in the family Strophocheilidae, from the Paleocene deposits of the Itaboraí Basin, in the state of Rio de Janeiro, Brazil.
