= Cabuçu (Itaboraí) =

Cabuçu is a neighborhood in the city of Itaboraí, Rio de Janeiro Brazil. It is part of the 6th district along with Curuzu and São José.

It is a typical rural district, with small and medium farms. It borders the neighborhoods of São José, Badureco and Largo da Idéia, the latter being part of the municipality of São Gonçalo.

Most of its population is religious (especially evangelicals), so the neighborhood has many churches, 25 in total. The most important church is the chapel of Nossa Senhora Aparecida located next to the DPO (Detachment Policing Ostensibly Cabuçu) that makes the neighborhood processions every year on October 12 (Day of Our Lady Aparecida). Another important church in the neighborhood is the Evangelical Congregational Church located in an area further from the shopping district.

== Sanitation ==
The neighborhood has problems related to sanitation. The main one is the lack of running water that used to be distributed by the licensee Univerde. Due to the lack of payment, water distribution was suspended for half of the neighborhood, thus the residents are mostly helped with water trucks.

== Streets and Transportation ==
Most neighborhood streets are unpaved and the few that are paved have potholes, Spotlight on the road that links the idea of Largo Cabuçu (Currency with the municipality of São Gonçalo) which has no pavement and is very poor from start to finish in the locality known as Boi buffalo (as the locals say there were many buffaloes in the village). The best street in the neighborhood and the most important is the Alderman Road Cicero Antonio de Souza, (popularly known as Cabuçu Road) linking to the center of Itaboraí.

Transport in the neighborhood is done by the Transportation Rio Ita, and most of the buses are in poor condition, completely uncomfortable and dirty. The delay in such transport is also very large, which affect the residents that must work in Niterói and São Gonçalo

== Leisure & Recreation ==
The more traditional entertainment in the district is the naked football on Sundays between teams in the region, including the oldest amateur football team of the district (United States of Worcester), founded in 1992 by players Jorge Roberto de Freitas, Sebastian Cabral, Anderson Fernandes and Marcio Cordeiro Felizardo.

== Subdivisions ==
The district Cabuçu is divided into six parts: Tatiana Vila, Vila Verde, Vila Verde II, Youth, Largo de São Sebastião and Santo Mé. In the Largo de São Sebastião was shot in 2007 the show on Rede Globo Heavy Load, because the old buildings that are in place and the church of San Sebastian which was the scene of a staged marriage to actor junino Antônio Fagundes, the region is also marked by lots of greenery, farms and sites that triggered the episode title to (Formula headless).

== Economic activities ==
The main economic activities of the area is livestock, the cultivation of fruits and vegetables.
