= Protolipterna =

Protolipterna Temporal range: Late Paleocene-Early Eocene ~58–55 Ma

Scientific classification
- Kingdom: Animalia
- Phylum: Chordata
- Class: Mammalia
- Order: †Litopterna
- Family: †Protolipternidae
- Genus: †Protolipterna; Cifelli 1983

Type species
- †Protolipterna ellipsodontoides Cifelli, 1983

Species
- P. ellipsodontoides Cifelli 1983

Extinct genus of mammals

Protolipterna is an extinct genus of mammal, belonging to the order Litopterna. It lived during the Late Paleocene and the Early Eocene, in what is now South America.

== Description ==
It was a small-sized animal, not exceeding 35 centimeters in length; it weighed approximately one kilogram. It had a compact body and elongated and slender legs. Its general appearance was comparable to that of a modern chevrotain. Its dentition possessed low-crowned brachyodont and bunodont molars, but it also had long upper fang-shaped canines, not unlike today's chevrotains. Its legs, elongated and slender, suggest a digitigrade gait, unlike its contemporaries, such as Colbertia, which were plantigrades.

== Classification ==
Prtolitopterna ellipsodotoides was first described by Cifelli in 1983, based on fragmentary mandible preserving teeth, found in the Itaboraí Formation of Brazil, in terrains dated from the end of the Paleocene or the Early Eocene. Several other fossils were later found, making it possible to reconstruct its appearance and affinities.

Protolipterna was a basal litoptern, a clade of mammals that diversified in South America during the Cenozoic. Protolipterna is the eponymous genus of Protolipternidae, a possibly paraphyletic family including some of the most basal members of Litopterna. The name Protolipterna is an anagram of Litopterna coupled with the prefix proto-, "first". One of the close relatives of this genus was Asmithwoodwardia.

== Paleoecology ==
Studies of the postcranial skeleton of Protolipterna allows to hypothesize that this animal, with its long digitigrade legs, was able to run quickly and to jump. Its bunodont molars were ideal for the consumption of tender foliage. It is unclear whether the long upper canines were a feature affecting only of the two sexes. Based on the dental and mandibular morphology of P. ellipsodontoides, the species was not herbivorous like later litopterns but was instead an omnivore.

== Bibliography ==
- F. Ameghino. 1901. Notices préliminaires sur des ongulés nouveaux des terrains crétacés de Patagonie [Preliminary notes on new ungulates from the Cretaceous terrains of Patagonia]. Boletin de la Academia Nacional de Ciencias de Córdoba 16:349-429
- G. G. Simpson. 1948. The beginning of the age of mammals in South America. Part I. Bulletin of the American Museum of Natural History 91:1-232
- C. d. Paula Couto. 1952. Fossil mammals from the beginning of the Cenozoic in Brazil. Condylarthra, Litopterna, Xenungulata, and Astrapotheria. Bulletin of the American Museum of Natural History 99(6):355-394
- R. Cifelli. 1985. Biostratigraphy of the Casamayoran, Early Eocene of Patagonia. American Museum Novitates 2820:1-26
- E. V. Oliveira and F. J. Goin. 2011. A reassessment of bunodont metatherians from the Paleogene of Itaborai (Brazil): Systematics and the age of the Itaborian SALMA. Revista Brasileira de Paleontologia 14(2):105-136
