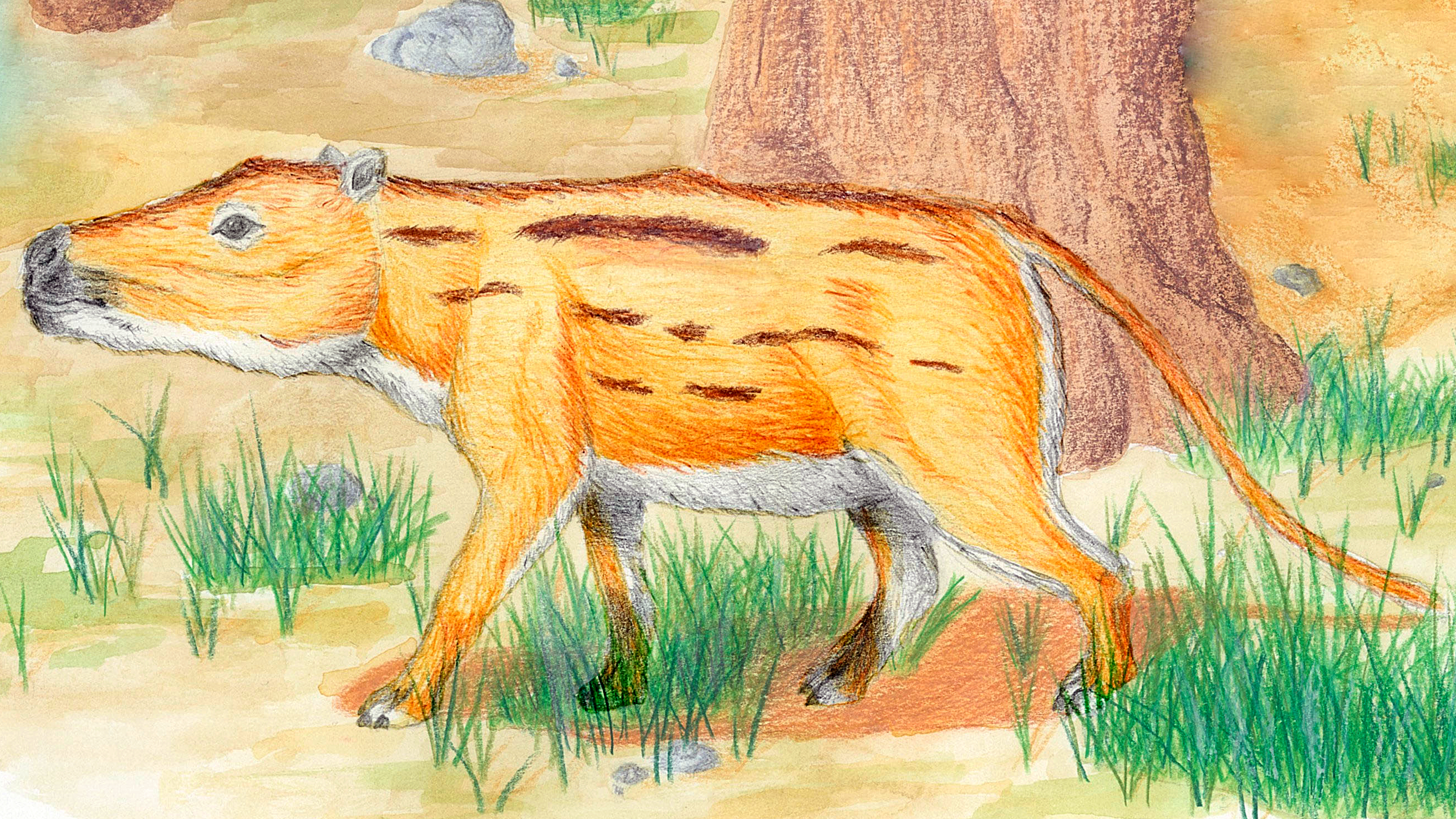

Scientific classification
- Domain: Eukaryota
- Kingdom: Animalia
- Phylum: Chordata
- Class: Mammalia
- Family: †Didolodontidae
- Genus: †Didolodus; Ameghino 1897

Species
- D. latigonus; D. magnus; D. minor; D. multicuspis (type)

Synonyms
- Cephanodus Ameghino 1902; Lonchoconus Ameghino 1901; Nephacodus Ameghino 1902

= Didolodus =

Didolodus Temporal range: Mid Eocene (Divisaderan) ~40.4–37.2 Ma

Extinct genus of mammals

Didolodus is an extinct genus of mammals from Middle Eocene Argentina. It is an ungulate mammal of uncertain affinities, possibly related to Litopterna, though this is uncertain due to the lack of reliable post-cranial remains, and for now remains Meridiungulata incertae sedis. Its remains were found in the Sarmiento Formation of Patagonia.

Didolodus probably was a quick-footed creature which probably lived like early ungulates such as Propalaeotherium, based on its highly similar teeth. It was around 60 centimetres (2.0 ft) in length, with short limbs and a long tail.

== Phylogeny ==
Cladogram after Gelfo and Sigé, 2011:

- - Protungulatum
  - - Phenacodus
    - Kollpaniinae
      - Simoclaenus
      - - Molinodus
        - - Tiuclaenus
          - - Andinodus
            - Pucanodus
    - Didolodontidae
      - Paulacoutoia protocenica
      - Lamegoia conodonta
      - Paulogervaisia inusta
      - Didolodus
        - Didolodus magnus
        - Didolodus multicuspis
        - Didolodus minor
      - Ernestokokenia
        - Ernestokokenia nitida
        - Ernestokokenia chaishoer
        - Ernestokokenia yirunhor
      - - Escribania chubutensis
        - - Escribania talonicuspis
          - - Raulvaccia peligrensis
            - Umayodus raimondi
