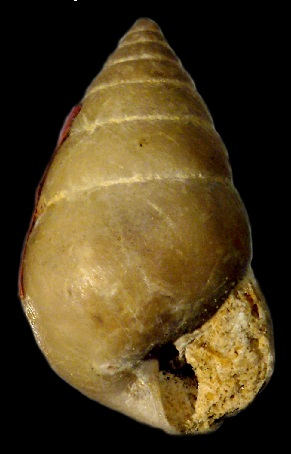
- Apertural view of a fossil shell of Bulimulus fazendicus

Scientific classification
- Domain: Eukaryota
- Kingdom: Animalia
- Phylum: Mollusca
- Class: Gastropoda
- Order: Stylommatophora
- Family: Bulimulidae
- Genus: Bulimulus
- Species: B. fazendicus

Binomial name
- Bulimulus fazendicus Maury 1935

Synonyms
- Itaborahia fazendicus

= Bulimulus fazendicus =

Bulimulus fazendicus Temporal range: Late Paleocene (Itaboraian-Riochican) ~58–55 Ma

Extinct species of gastropod

Bulimulus fazendicus is a fossil species of air-breathing land snail, a terrestrial pulmonate gastropod mollusk in the family Bulimulidae, from the Late Paleocene (Itaboraian to Riochican) deposits of the Itaboraí Basin in Brazil.
