= Austrodiscus lopesi =

Austrodiscus lopesi Temporal range: Paleocene

Scientific classification
- Kingdom: Animalia
- Phylum: Mollusca
- Class: Gastropoda
- Order: Stylommatophora
- Family: Charopidae
- Genus: †Austrodiscus
- Species: †A. lopesi

Binomial name
- †Austrodiscus lopesi Fereira & Coelho, 1989

Extinct species of gastropod

Austrodiscus lopesi is a fossil species of air-breathing land snail, a terrestrial pulmonate gastropod mollusk in the family Charopidae, from the Paleocene deposits of the Itaboraí Basin in Brazil.
