= Austrodiscus =

Austrodiscus Temporal range: Paleocene

Scientific classification
- Kingdom: Animalia
- Phylum: Mollusca
- Class: Gastropoda
- Order: Stylommatophora
- Family: Charopidae
- Genus: †Austrodiscus; Parodiz, 1957

Species
- †A. lopesi

Extinct genus of gastropods

Austrodiscus is a fossil genus of medium-sized air-breathing land snails, terrestrial pulmonate gastropods in the family Charopidae.

This genus is known from the Paleocene deposits of the Itaboraí Basin, in the state of Rio de Janeiro, Brazil, although the placement of the species (A. lopesi) in this genus remains uncertain.

== Species ==
The genus includes the following species:

- A. lopesi Fereira & Coelho, 1989.
