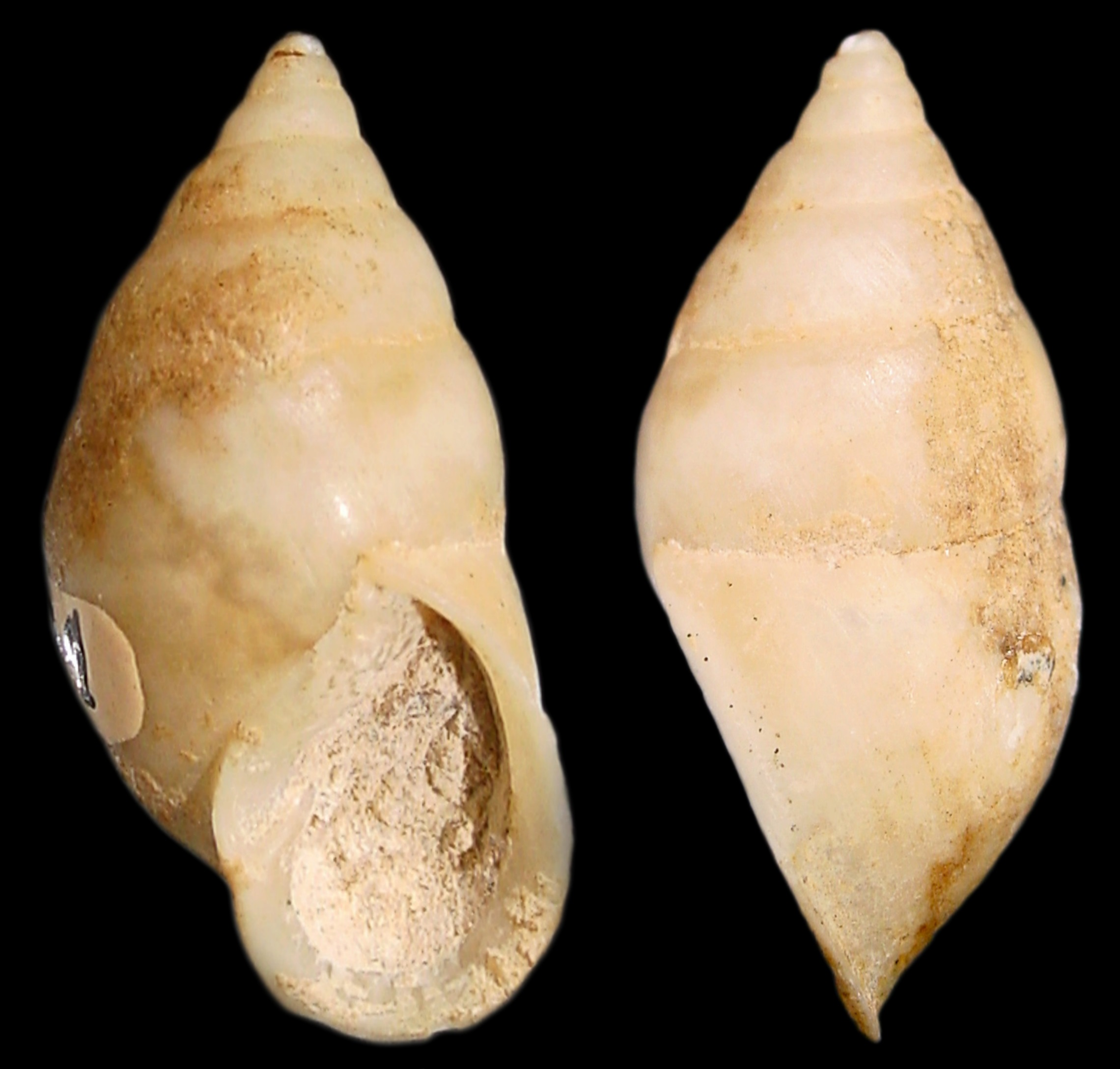
- Two views of a fossil shell of Itaborahia lamegoi

Scientific classification
- Kingdom: Animalia
- Phylum: Mollusca
- Class: Gastropoda
- Order: Stylommatophora
- Family: Bulimulidae
- Genus: †Itaborahia; Maury, 1935

Type species
- †Itaborahia lamegoi Maury, 1935

Species
- †I. lamegoi

Diversity
- 1 extinct species

= Itaborahia =

Itaborahia Temporal range: Paleocene

Extinct genus of gastropods

Itaborahia is a fossil genus of medium-sized air-breathing land snails, terrestrial pulmonate gastropods in the family Bulimulidae. The genus is known only from the Brazilian Paleocene deposits of the Itaboraí Basin, in the state of Rio de Janeiro.

== Species ==
The only species currently in this genus is Itaborahia lamegoi Maury, 1935, although some other species were previously included within this genus.
