= Corallus priscus =

Corallus priscus Temporal range: Early Eocene (Itaboraian) ~53–50 Ma

Scientific classification
- Kingdom: Animalia
- Phylum: Chordata
- Class: Reptilia
- Order: Squamata
- Suborder: Serpentes
- Family: Boidae
- Genus: Corallus
- Species: C. priscus

Binomial name
- Corallus priscus Rage 2001

Extinct species of snake

Corallus priscus is an extinct species of tree boa which lived during the Early Eocene of Brazil, South America. Fossils of the snake were found in the Itaboraí Formation.
