= Riostegotherium =

Riostegotherium Temporal range: Early-Late Eocene (Itaboraian-Divisaderan) ~53–41 Ma

Scientific classification
- Domain: Eukaryota
- Kingdom: Animalia
- Phylum: Chordata
- Class: Mammalia
- Order: Cingulata
- Family: Dasypodidae
- Genus: †Riostegotherium; Oliveira & Bergqvist, 1998
- Species: †R. yanei

Binomial name
- †Riostegotherium yanei Oliveira & Bergqvist, 1998

Extinct genus of mammals

Riostegotherium was an extinct genus of armadillo from the Early to Late Eocene of South America. Fossils of the genus have been found in the Andesitas Huancache Formation of Argentina and in the Itaboraí Formation, Rio de Janeiro, Brazil.

== Etymology ==
The genus is named Riostegotherium after Rio, of Rio de Janeiro, in reference to the state where the specimens were found; stego (Latin), meaning "covering"; therium (a Latinized Greek word), meaning "beast", a commonly used suffix for mammalian genera.

== Description ==
It is known from fossil of armoured ossicles which are similar to the ossicles of the armour of modern armadillos that is obvious that in South American as far back as the late Paleocene armoured armadillos existed. Leg bones found in the area of probably came from Riostegotherium as well.
