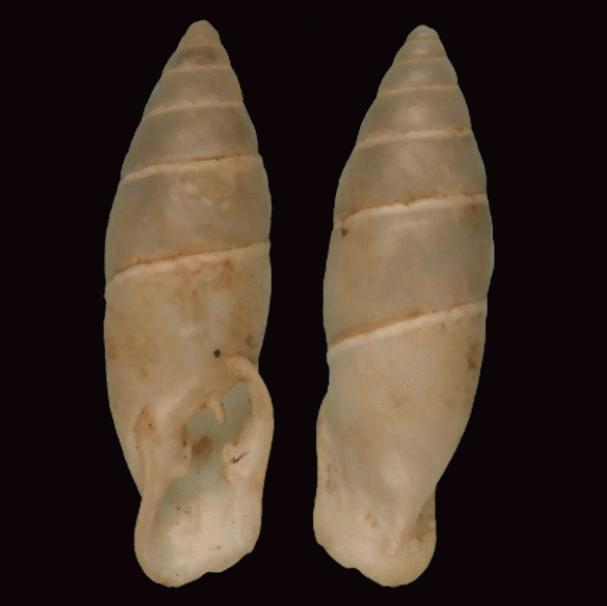
- Shell of Bahiensis albofilosus (specimen at Museum für Naturkunde Berlin)

Scientific classification
- Kingdom: Animalia
- Phylum: Mollusca
- Class: Gastropoda
- Order: Stylommatophora
- Family: Cyclodontinidae
- Genus: Bahiensis; Jousseaume, 1877

Type species
- Helix (Cochlogena) bahiensis S. Moricand, 1834

= Bahiensis =

Genus of gastropods

Bahiensis is a genus of air-breathing land snails, terrestrial pulmonate gastropod mollusks in the family Cyclodontinidae.

== Species ==
- Bahiensis albofilosus (Dohrn, 1883)
- Bahiensis bahiensis (S. Moricand, 1834)
- Bahiensis ciaranus (Dohrn, 1882)
- Bahiensis fuscagulus (I. Lea, 1834)
- Bahiensis guarani (A. d'Orbigny, 1835)
- Bahiensis janeirensis (G. B. Sowerby I, 1838)
- Bahiensis longulus (L. Pfeiffer, 1859)
- Bahiensis miliolus (A. d'Orbigny, 1835)
- Bahiensis neglectus (L. Pfeiffer, 1847)
- Bahiensis oblitus (Reeve, 1848)
- Bahiensis occultus (Reeve, 1849)
- † Bahiensis priscus Cabrera & S. Martínez, 2012
- Bahiensis punctatissimus (R. P. Lesson, 1831)
- Bahiensis reevei (Deshayes, 1851)
- Bahiensis rhodinostomus (A. d'Orbigny, 1835)
- Bahiensis ribeirensis Salvador, Cavallari & Simone, 2016
- Bahiensis ringens (Dunker, 1847)

Synonyms

- Bahiensis paralellus (L. Pfeiffer, 1857): synonym of Bahiensis occultus (Reeve, 1849) (junior subjective synonym)
