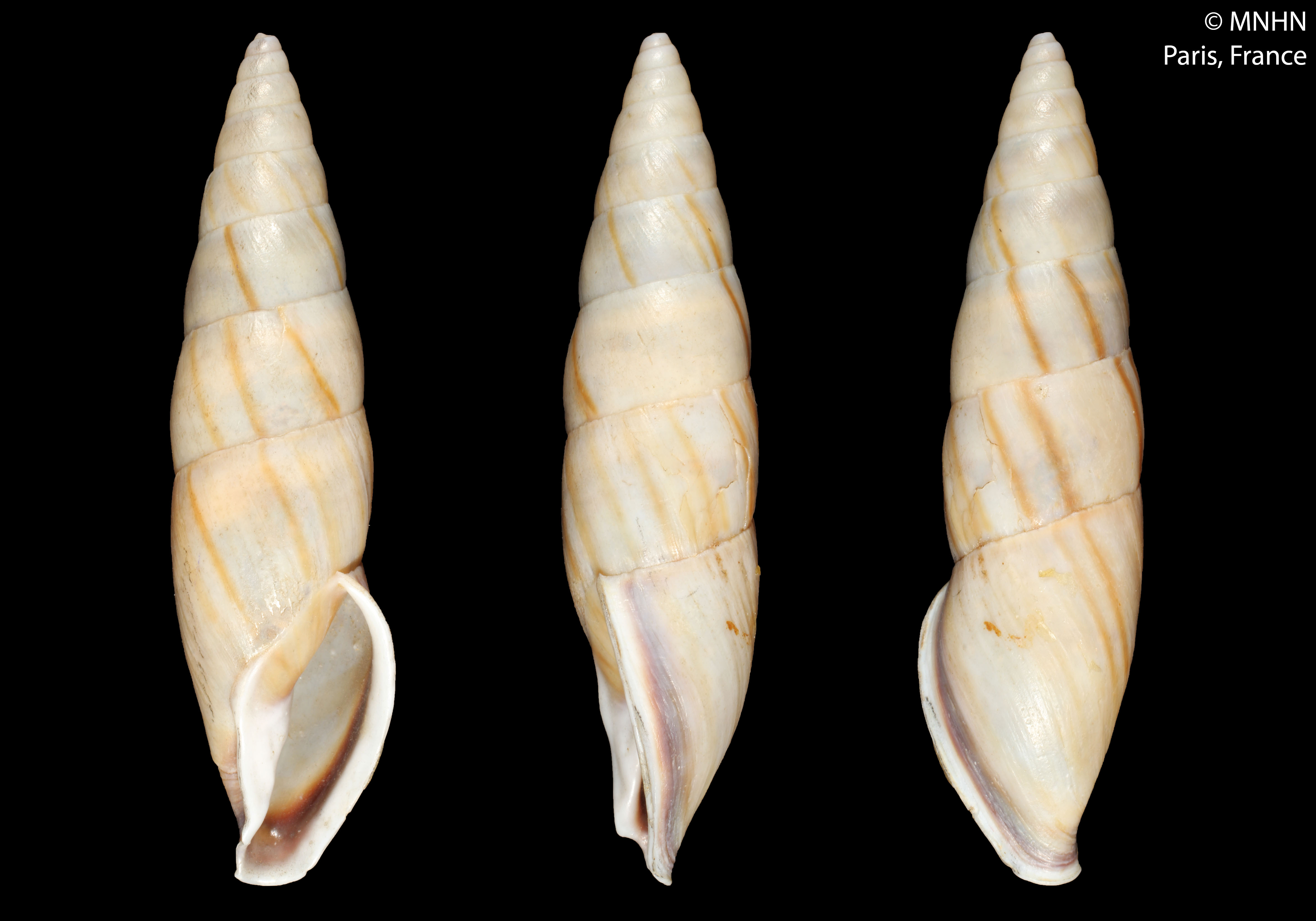
- Shell of Moricandia fusiformis (syntype at MNHN, Paris)

Scientific classification
- Kingdom: Animalia
- Phylum: Mollusca
- Class: Gastropoda
- Order: Stylommatophora
- Suborder: Helicina
- Superfamily: Orthalicoidea
- Family: Cyclodontinidae
- Genus: Moricandia [[[Henry Augustus Pilsbry|Pilsbry]] & Vanatta, 1898

Synonyms
- Odontostomus (Moricandia) Pilsbry & Vanatta, 1898

= Moricandia (gastropod) =

Genus of gastropods

Moricandia is a genus of tropical air-breathing land snails, terrestrial pulmonate gastropod mollusks in the family Cyclodontinidae.

== Species ==
- Moricandia angulata (Wagner, 1827)
- Moricandia auriscervina (A. Férussac, 1821)
- Moricandia bouvieri (Dautzenberg, 1896)
- Moricandia fusiformis (Rang, 1831)
- Moricandia nasuta (E. von Martens, 1885)
- Moricandia parallela (L. Pfeiffer, 1857)
- Moricandia tolerata (Fulton, 1903)
- Moricandia willi (Dohrn, 1883)

Species brought into synonymy

- Moricandia dubiosa (Jay, 1839): synonym of Moricandia fusiformis (Rang, 1831)
