= Eutreptodactylus =

Eutreptodactylus Temporal range: Late Eocene (Itaboraian)

Scientific classification
- Kingdom: Animalia
- Phylum: Chordata
- Class: Aves
- Order: Cuculiformes
- Family: Cuculidae
- Genus: †Eutreptodactylus; Baird & Vickers-Rich, 1997
- Species: †E. itaboraiensis

Binomial name
- †Eutreptodactylus itaboraiensis Baird & Vickers-Rich, 1997

Extinct genus of birds

Eutreptodactylus is an extinct genus of insectivorous bird known from the Early Eocene period (Itaboraian) of Brazil. It was probably the most primitive member of the order Cuculiformes. Fossils have been found in the Itaboraí Formation at São José de Itaborai.
