= Line 3 (Rio de Janeiro) =

Proposed metro line in Rio de Janeiro

Rio de Janeiro Metro Line 3

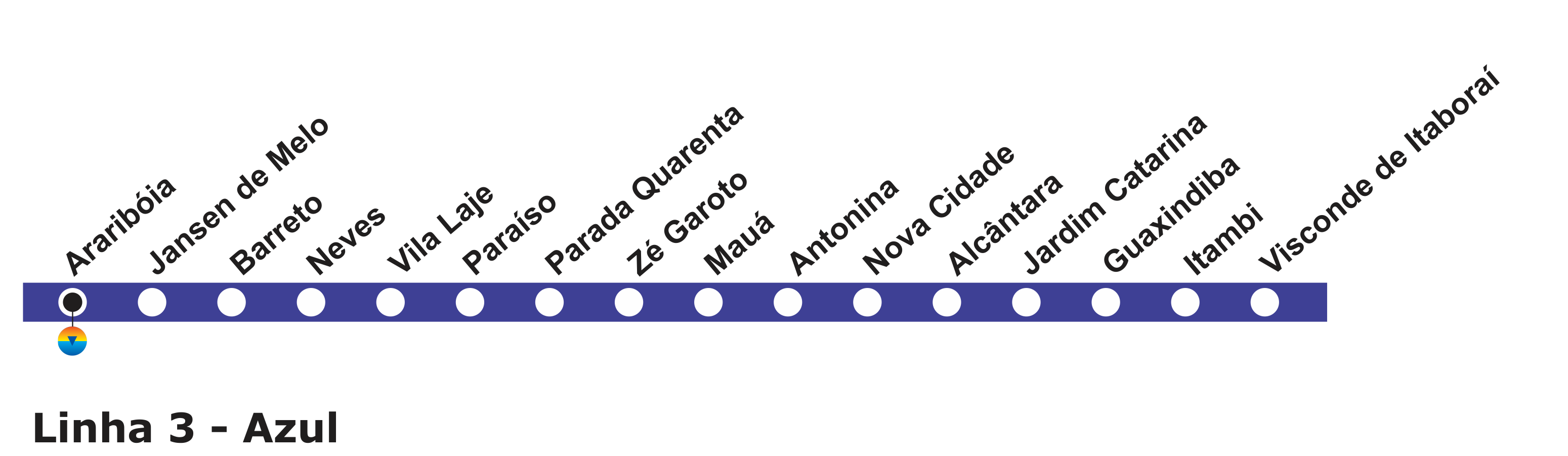

Overview
- Status: Proposed
- Locale: Niterói; São Gonçalo; Itaboraí
- Termini: Araribóia; Visconde de Itaboraí
- Stations: 18

Service
- Type: Rapid transit
- System: Rio de Janeiro Metro

History
- Planned opening: Unknown

Technical
- Line length: 42 km (26 mi)

Line 3 of the Rio de Janeiro Metro is a planned line which would connect Rio de Janeiro and Niterói. This is a challenge due to the fact that the line would need to cross the Guanabara Bay, presumably underwater. Niterói last had rail service of any kind in 2007 and its public transit is currently only served by buses and boats.

== Background ==
The plan to build a subway line connecting Rio de Janeiro to its sister municipality, Niterói, has existed since at least 1968. In the 1968 plan, it was estimated that the line would've been built by 1990. However, that deadline was never met. Throughout the following decades, many more promises were made – and subsequently not kept – by a multitude of governors of Rio de Janeiro regarding the construction of Line 3, and it remains unbuilt.

=== 2000–2009 ===
In 2002, the project was divided into two parts: part 1, with a length of 6 kilometres (3.7 mi), extending underneath Guanabara Bay from Carioca Station (Rio de Janeiro) to Arariboia Station (Niterói); and part 2, with a length of roughly 21 kilometres (13 mi), extending from Arariboia Station (Niterói) to Guaxindiba (São Gonçalo), with segments above ground.

In 2006, a seminar called "Rio de Janeiro on Rails – Subway Line 3" (Portuguese: Rio de Janeiro nos Trilhos – Linha 3 do Metrô) was held by the Brazilian Association of the Railway Industry (Associação Brasileira da Indústria Ferroviária, shortened as ABIFER) to discuss the implementation of the project of Line 3.

=== 2010–2019 ===
In 2011, the Brazilian Ministry of Works announced that construction on the line would begin that year for a 2014 opening. The line would feature an existing 23 kilometres (14 mi) suburban rail alignment in Niterói, São Gonçalo and Itaboraí being upgraded to metro standard, and a 4 kilometres (2.5 mi) tunnel under Guanabara Bay to Rio de Janeiro. Federal funds for the construction, totalling R$1.2 billion, were initially intended to be granted in 2012, but were barred by Congress in late 2011.

In September 2013, governor Sérgio Cabral and president Dilma Rousseff announced a partnership between the federal and state governments, with the goal of collecting R$2.57 billion in total to be put towards the construction of Line 3.

In October 2014, governor Pezão stated his intent in starting the construction of Line 3 before the end of the year. Eight months later, in June 2015, Pezão explained that the state's government didn't have the necessary funds to build it, which had an estimated cost of R$3.9 billion. The Director Plan of Urban Transportation of 2015 (Plano Diretor de Transportes Urbanos) estimated that construction of its many projects should be done by 2036, but that it would be ideal for them to be finished by 2021.

In July 2019, governor Wilson Witzel guaranteed that, during his administration, the construction of Line 3 would begin. Six months later, in January 2020, Witzel stated that the administration was considering whether building more boat stations would be more effective than building Line 3. Later that year, in August 2020, Witzel was suspended from office – and was subsequently impeached in April 2021 –, being replaced by Cláudio Castro as governor of Rio de Janeiro.

=== 2020–2029 ===
Cláudio Castro, elected in 2022 as governor of Rio de Janeiro, stated in the government plans that he intended on constructing Line 3.

In January 2023, after president Lula requested each state governor for a list of four pending construction works in their state that could use federal aid, Castro did not include the Line 3 expansion in his list, stating: "It's no use for me, right now, to talk about the metro Line 3, that, although very important, is very held up in terms of project maturity. [...] It's no use to talk about something to be done in three, four years". In February 2023, when directly asked if Line 3 was planned for 2023, Castro's government deflected by speaking about the new bus service planned for São Gonçalo, MUVI. Line 3 was not built during Castro's government, which ended prematurely in March 2026 following an investigation by the Superior Electoral Court which made him unelectable.

Despite it being under the Rio de Janeiro state's jurisdiction, in January 2025, during bids to become the hosts of the 2031 Pan American Games, the city governments of Rio de Janeiro and Niterói announced Line 3 would be part of the preparations for the event, citing an agreement with the state government. After losing the bid to Asunción, both city governments have backed away from the promise.

In June 2025, the Federal Government commissioned COPPE to build a plan for Line 3; a year later, in June 2026, its first results were announced, showing how much of a positive impact one such metro line could have on the populations of both cities. There are still several steps left on the project, such as surveying public preferences, estimating demand and revenue, planning infrastructure and evaluating the economical and financial aspects of it; furthermore, 2026 is an election year in Brazil, which could affect plans. The commission has a 30 month deadline, to expire at the end of 2027, and a budget of R$26 million.
