= Perutherium =

Perutherium Temporal range: Late Paleocene-Early Eocene (Itaboraian-Casamayoran) ~58.7–48.6 Ma

Scientific classification
- Domain: Eukaryota
- Kingdom: Animalia
- Phylum: Chordata
- Class: Mammalia
- Order: †Notoungulata
- Genus: †Perutherium; Grambast et al. 1967
- Species: †P. altiplanense

Binomial name
- †Perutherium altiplanense Grambast et al. 1967

Extinct genus of mammals

Perutherium is monospecific genus of notoungulates from the Late Paleocene to Early Eocene Muñani Formation of Peru. The holotype consists of a fragment of a lower jaw with the posterior half of the first molar and the anterior half of the second molar. A fragment of an upper molar from the same location may also belong to Perutherium.
