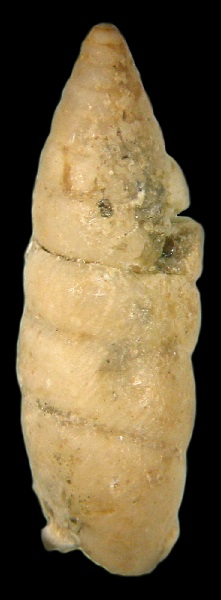
- A fossil shell of Temesa magalhaesi

Scientific classification
- Kingdom: Animalia
- Phylum: Mollusca
- Class: Gastropoda
- Order: Stylommatophora
- Family: Clausiliidae
- Genus: Temesa
- Species: T. magalhaesi

Binomial name
- Temesa magalhaesi (Trindade, 1953)

= Temesa magalhaesi =

Temesa magalhaesi Temporal range: Paleocene

Extinct species of gastropod

Temesa magalhaesi is a fossil species of air-breathing land snail, a terrestrial pulmonate gastropod mollusk in the family Clausiliidae, the door snails. The species is found in the Paleocene deposits of the Itaboraí Basin, in Brazil. This is the oldest{how old?} record of the subfamily, although the species is only tentatively placed in the genus.
