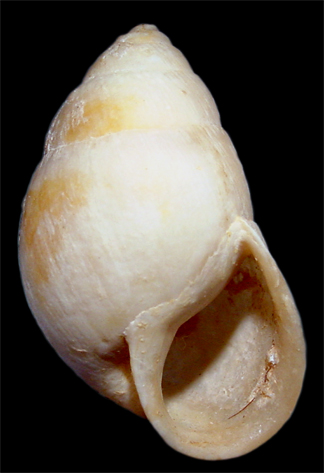
- apertural view of Eoborus sanctijosephi

Scientific classification
- Kingdom: Animalia
- Phylum: Mollusca
- Class: Gastropoda
- Order: Stylommatophora
- Family: Strophocheilidae
- Genus: †Eoborus; Klappenbach & Olazarri, 1970

Type species
- †Eoborus charruanus (Frenguelli, 1930)

Species
- †Eoborus berroi; †Eoborus charruanus; †Eoborus fusiforme; †Eoborus rotundus; †Eoborus sanctijosephi

= Eoborus =

Eoborus Temporal range: Paleocene–Miocene

Extinct genus of gastropods

Eoborus is a fossil genus of medium-sized air-breathing land snails, terrestrial pulmonate gastropods in the family Strophocheilidae. Eoborus is the oldest fossil record of Strophocheilidae, dating from the Middle Paleocene of Brazil (Itaboraí Basin) and Uruguay (Santa Lucía Basin). The Brazilian species, alongside Eoborus charruanus from Uruguay, are the oldest fossil record of the family.

The small size and large umbilicus of Eoborus are its most remarkable characteristics; it is considered primitive in the family Strophocheilidae.

== Species ==
Species within the genus Eoborus include:

- †Eoborus berroi Klappenbach & Olazarri, 1986 - from Uruguay
- †Eoborus charruanus (Frenguelli, 1930) - from Uruguay and Argentina - type species of genus
- †Eoborus fusiforme Salvador & Simone, 2013 - from Brazil
- †Eoborus rotundus Salvador & Simone, 2012 - from Brazil
- †Eoborus sanctijosephi (Maury, 1935) - from Brazil

Some authors note that two other species, Strophocheilus chubutensis and Strophocheilus hauthali could also belong to Eoborus.
