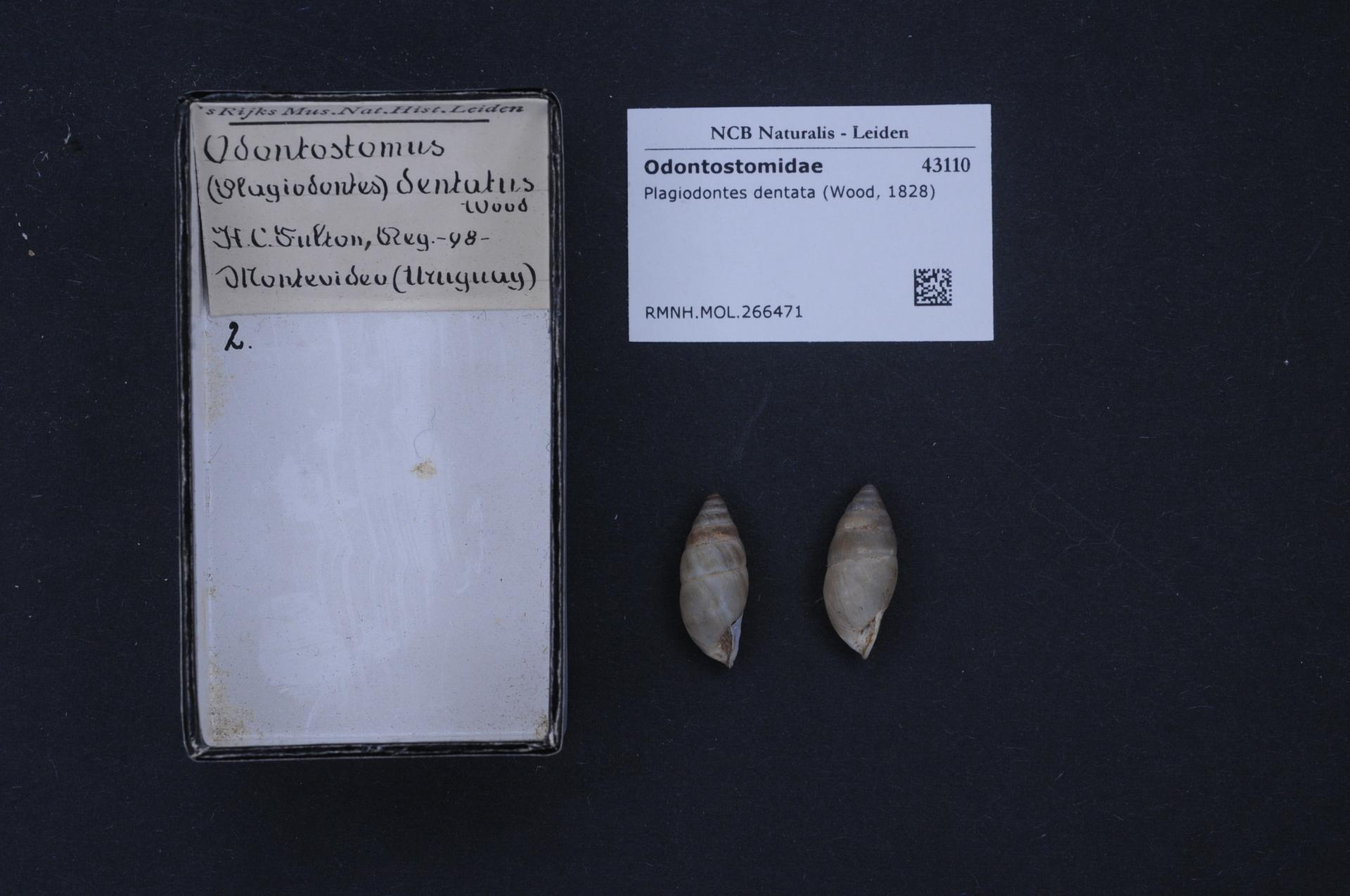

Scientific classification
- Kingdom: Animalia
- Phylum: Mollusca
- Class: Gastropoda
- Order: Stylommatophora
- Family: Cyclodontinidae
- Genus: Plagiodontes
- Species: P. dentatus

Binomial name
- Plagiodontes dentatus (Wood, 1828)

Synonyms
- Cyclodontina dentata

= Plagiodontes dentatus =

Plagiodontes dentatus Temporal range: Paleocene–Recent

Species of gastropod

Plagiodontes dentatus is a recent species of small to medium-sized air-breathing land snail, terrestrial pulmonate gastropods in the family Cyclodontinidae. It occurs in Entre Ríos Province, Argentina.

== Fossil record ==
Plagiodontes dentatus has a fossil record extending back to the Brazilian Paleocene, with a supposed specimen belonging to this species found in the limestones of Itaboraí Basin. It has also been recorded from the Miocene of Uruguay and Miocene and Pleistocene of Argentina.
