= Periprotodidelphis =

Periprotodidelphis Temporal range: Thanetian–Ypresian

Scientific classification
- Kingdom: Animalia
- Phylum: Chordata
- Class: Mammalia
- Infraclass: Marsupialia
- Family: †Protodidelphidae
- Genus: †Periprotodidelphis
- Species: †P. bergqvisti

Binomial name
- †Periprotodidelphis bergqvisti Oliveira and Goin, 2011

Extinct genus of protodidelphid metatherian

Periprotodidelphis is an extinct monotypic genus of protodidelphid metatherian that lived in South America from the Thanetian to the Ypresian stage of the Palaeogene period.

== Distribution ==
Periprotodidelphis bergqvisti, the type species, is only known from the Itaboraí Basin of Rio de Janeiro, Brazil.
