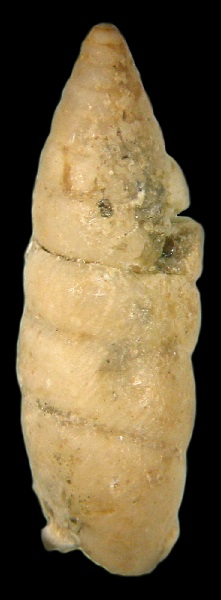
- A fossil shell of Temesa magalhaesi

Scientific classification
- Kingdom: Animalia
- Phylum: Mollusca
- Class: Gastropoda
- Order: Stylommatophora
- Family: Clausiliidae
- Genus: Temesa; H. Adams & A. Adams, 1855

Species
- †T. magalhaesi

= Temesa (gastropod) =

Temesa Temporal range: Paleocene

Genus of gastropods

Temesa is a genus of medium-sized air-breathing land snails, terrestrial pulmonate gastropods in the family Clausiliidae, the door snails. The fossil record of this genus ranges tentatively from the Brazilian Paleocene of the Itaboraí Basin, in Rio de Janeiro State, where the species T. magalhaesi is found.

== Species ==
The genus includes the following species:

- T. magalhaesi (Trindade, 1953) - fossil from Brazil
