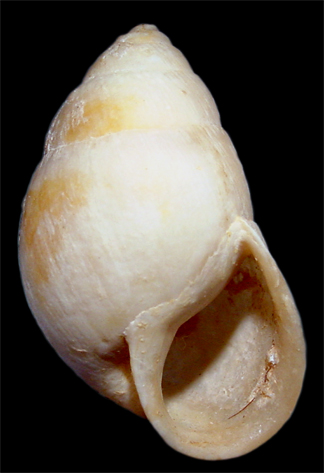

Scientific classification
- Kingdom: Animalia
- Phylum: Mollusca
- Class: Gastropoda
- Order: Stylommatophora
- Family: Strophocheilidae
- Genus: †Eoborus
- Species: †E. sanctijosephi

Binomial name
- †Eoborus sanctijosephi (Maury, 1935)

Synonyms
- Strophocheilus sanctijosephi Megalobulimus sanctijosephi Carinifex fluminensis Vorticifex fluminensis

= Eoborus sanctijosephi =

Eoborus sanctijosephi Temporal range: Paleocene

Extinct species of gastropod

Eoborus sanctijosephi is a fossil species of air-breathing land snail, a terrestrial pulmonate gastropod mollusc in the family Strophocheilidae, from the Paleocene Itaboraí Basin, Brazil. Eoborus sanctijosephi is a large species in the genus Eoborus. Its name makes reference to the place of discovery: the São José de Itaboraí municipality, where Itaboraí Basin is located.

The species was originally described as Strophocheilus sanctijosephi, but was later transferred to the genus Eoborus. The species Vorticifex fluminensis (Brito, 1967) was considered to be the fragment of the spire top of E. sanctijosephi and, thus, its synonym.
