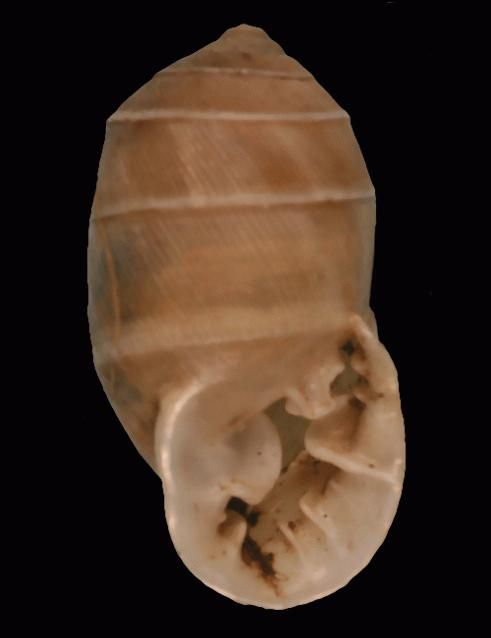
- Plagiodontes_weyenberghii

Scientific classification
- Kingdom: Animalia
- Phylum: Mollusca
- Class: Gastropoda
- Order: Stylommatophora
- Suborder: Helicina
- Superfamily: Orthalicoidea
- Family: Cyclodontinidae
- Genus: Plagiodontes; Doering, 1876

Type species
- Pupa dentata W. Wood, 1828

Synonyms
- Bulimus (Plagiodontes) Doering, 1877 (original rank); Odontostomus (Plagiodontes) Doering, 1877 (unaccepted combination)

= Plagiodontes =

Plagiodontes Temporal range: Paleocene–Recent

Genus of gastropods

Plagiodontes is a recent genus of small to medium-sized air-breathing land snails, terrestrial pulmonate gastropods in the family Cyclodontinidae.

It occurs in tropical and sub-tropical regions of South America.

== Fossil record ==
The fossil record of Plagiodontes extends back to the Brazilian Paleocene, with a supposed specimen of Plagiodontes dentatus found in Itaboraí Basin. This same species has also been recorded from the Miocene of Uruguay and Miocene and Pleistocene of Argentina.

== Species ==
Species within the genus Plagiodontes include:

- Plagiodontes brackebuschii (Doering, 1877)
- Plagiodontes daedaleus (Deshayes, 1851)
- Plagiodontes dentatus (Wood, 1828) - fossil from Brazil, Uruguay and Argentina, recent from Argentina - type species of genus
- Plagiodontes multiplicatus (Doering, 1877)
- Plagiodontes parodizi Pizá & Cazzaniga, 2016
- Plagiodontes patagonicus (d'Orbigny, 1835)
- Plagiodontes rocae Doering, 1881
- Plagiodontes strobelii (Doering, 1877)
- Plagiodontes weyenberghii (Doering, 1877)
- Plagiodontes weyrauchi Pizá & Cazzaniga, 2009

Synonyms

- Plagiodontes dentata (Wood, 1828): synonym of Plagiodontes dentatus (W. Wood, 1828) (incorrect gender of species epithet)
- Plagiodontes iheringi (Pilsbry & Vanatta, 1898): synonym of Plagiodontes patagonicus (d'Orbigny, 1835)
- Plagiodontes patagonica (d'Orbigny, 1835): synonym of Plagiodontes patagonicus (d'Orbigny, 1835) (incorrect gender of species epithet)
- Plagiodontes trahyrae - from Brazil: synonym of Cyclodontina trahyrae (S. H. F. Jaeckel, 1950)
