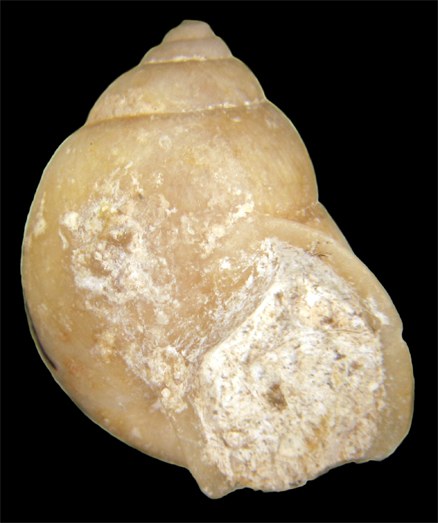

Scientific classification
- Kingdom: Animalia
- Phylum: Mollusca
- Class: Gastropoda
- Order: Stylommatophora
- Family: Strophocheilidae
- Genus: †Eoborus
- Species: †E. rotundus

Binomial name
- †Eoborus rotundus Salvador & Simone, 2012

= Eoborus rotundus =

Eoborus rotundus Temporal range: Paleocene

Extinct species of gastropod

Eoborus rotundus is a fossil species of air-breathing land snail, a terrestrial pulmonate gastropod mollusc in the family Strophocheilidae, from the Paleocene Itaboraí Basin, Brazil. Eoborus rotundus is a small species for the genus Eoborus, and the shell has a more rounded shape than average for the genus, a feature reflected in its species name.
