= Epidolops =

Epidolops Temporal range: 58.7–57.0 Ma

Scientific classification
- Kingdom: Animalia
- Phylum: Chordata
- Class: Mammalia
- Order: †Polydolopimorphia
- Family: †Bonapartheriidae
- Genus: †Epidolops; Paula Couto, 1952
- Species: †E. ameghinoi

Binomial name
- †Epidolops ameghinoi Paula Couto, 1952

Extinct genus of South American metatherian

Epidolops is an extinct monotypic genus of polydolopimorphian metatherian that lived during the Paleogene in what is now South America.

== Distribution ==
Epidolops ameghinoi is known from the Itaboraí fossil site of Brazil. Epidolops fossils have also been found in the Las Flores Formation of Argentina.

== Description ==
E. ameghinoi had diminutive maxillopalatine fenestrae, a large pterygoid fossa laterally enclosed by a prominent ectopterygoid crest, and a mandibular fossa that was simple and planar. The species lacked a masseteric process. The postglenoid process was immediately anterior to the postglenoid foramen. The hypotympanic sinus was unossified.
