= Asmithwoodwardia =

Asmithwoodwardia Temporal range: Late Paleocene-Early Eocene ~58–47 Ma

Scientific classification
- Kingdom: Animalia
- Phylum: Chordata
- Class: Mammalia
- Infraclass: Placentalia
- Order: †Litopterna
- Family: †Protolipternidae
- Genus: †Asmithwoodwardia; Ameghino 1901

Type species
- Asmithwoodwardia subtrigona Ameghino, 1901

Species
- A. scotti Paula Couto 1952; A. subtrigona Ameghino 1901

Extinct genus of litopterns

Asmithwoodwardia is an extinct genus of mammals, from the order Litopterna. It lived during the Late Paleocene and the Early Eocene, and its fossilized remains were found in South America.

== Description ==
Known almost only from skull material and teeth, this animal may have been comparable in size with a large hare. Its skull was elongated, with orbits opening halfway through the skull, and a dentition evocating that of the North American "condylarth" Hyopsodus. A talus bone found associated with cranial materials from Asmithwoodwardia, however, shows affinities with early litopterns.

== Classification ==
The genus Asmithwoodwardia was first described in 1901 by Florentino Ameghino, based on fossilized remains found in Patagonia in terrains dated from the Early Eocene. The type species, Asmithwoodwardia subtrigona, is based on four molars. More complete remains, with similar but not identical molars, were found in the Itaboraí Formation of Brazil and were a few million years older than the type species, from the Late Paleocene; the species A. scotti was established based on those remains.

Historically, Asmithwoodwardia was considered a South American member of a North American condylarth family, the Hyopsodontidae, and in particular related to the genus Hyopsodus. However, more recent discoveries of archaic South American ungulates and the attribution of a peculiarly shaped talus bone to Asmithwoodwardia indicates that this animal was a basal litoptern, a group of South American ungulates that thrived during the Cenozoic and occupied a variety of ecological niches. Asmithwoodwardia may have been a member of the possibly paraphyletic family Protolitopternidae, which included the most basal litopterns.

== Bibliography ==
- F. Ameghino. 1901. Notices préliminaires sur des ongulés nouveaux des terrains crétacés de Patagonie [Preliminary notes on new ungulates from the Cretaceous terrains of Patagonia]. Boletin de la Academia Nacional de Ciencias de Córdoba 16:349-429
- G. G. Simpson. 1948. The beginning of the age of mammals in South America. Part I. Bulletin of the American Museum of Natural History 91:1-232
- C. d. Paula Couto. 1952. Fossil mammals from the beginning of the Cenozoic in Brazil. Condylarthra, Litopterna, Xenungulata, and Astrapotheria. Bulletin of the American Museum of Natural History 99(6):355-394
- R. Cifelli. 1985. Biostratigraphy of the Casamayoran, Early Eocene of Patagonia. American Museum Novitates 2820:1-26
- E. V. Oliveira and F. J. Goin. 2011. A reassessment of bunodont metatherians from the Paleogene of Itaborai (Brazil): Systematics and the age of the Itaborian SALMA. Revista Brasileira de Paleontologia 14(2):105-136
