= Cyclodontinidae =

Scientific classification
- Kingdom: Animalia
- Phylum: Mollusca
- Class: Gastropoda
- Order: Stylommatophora
- Suborder: Helicina
- Superfamily: Orthalicoidea
- Family: Cyclodontinidae; Salvador & Breure, 2023

Genera
- See text

Family of gastropods

Cyclodontinidae is a taxonomic family of medium-sized to large, air-breathing, tropical and sub-tropical land snails, terrestrial pulmonate gastropod molluscs belonging to the superfamily Orthalicoidea.

== Genera ==
- Bahiensis Jousseaume, 1877
- Burringtonia Parodiz, 1944
- Clessinia Doering, 1875
- Cyclodontina H. Beck, 1837
- Moricandia Pilsbry & Vanatta, 1898
- Plagiodontes Doering, 1877
- Ventania Parodiz, 1940

Synonyms

- Euodontostomus Holmberg, 1912: synonym of Spixia Pilsbry & Vanatta, 1898: synonym of Clessinia Doering, 1875
- Scalarinella Dohrn, 1875: synonym of Clessinia Doering, 1875
- Spixia Pilsbry & Vanatta, 1898: synonym of Clessinia Doering, 1875
- Spixinella Hylton Scott, 1952: synonym of Spixia Pilsbry & Vanatta, 1898: synonym of Clessinia Doering, 1875
