= Waincophis =

Scientific classification
- Kingdom: Animalia
- Phylum: Chordata
- Class: Reptilia
- Order: Squamata
- Suborder: Serpentes
- Family: Boidae
- Genus: †Waincophis; Albino, 1987

Extinct genus of snakes

Waincophis is a genus of prehistoric snake known from Paleocene and Eocene deposits of what is now Brazil and Argentina. Three species have been described.
