= Talara Basin =

Depression in Peru

Talara Basin (Spanish: Cuenca de Talara) is a depression filled with sedimentary rock, that is a sedimentary basin, in northwestern Peru. On wider scale Talara Basin is located within rocks of an older and larger sedimentary basin that developed in the Mesozoic and Paleozoic. Talara Basin contains various minor oil and gas fields. The oil and gas reservoirs of the formation are trapped structural and stratigraphical features. The source rock of the oil and gas is thought to be marine shales of Cenozoic age but some may come from similar shales but of Cretaceous age. Oil has been extracted from its onshore field since the mid-1800s. The basin covers an area of no less than 15,000 km^{2}.
