= Ernestokokenia =

Ernestokokenia Temporal range: Early-Middle Eocene (Itaboraian-Mustersan) ~51–42 Ma

Scientific classification
- Kingdom: Animalia
- Phylum: Chordata
- Class: Mammalia
- Family: †Didolodontidae
- Genus: †Ernestokokenia; Ameghino 1901

Type species
- Ernestokokenia nitida Ameghino, 1901

Species
- E. chaishoer Simpson 1935; E. nitida Ameghino 1901; E. patagonica Ameghino 1901; E. trigonalis Ameghino 1901; E. yirunhor Simpson 1935

Synonyms
- Ernestokokenia marginata Ameghino 1901; Notoprotogonia patagonica Ameghino 1901; Euprotogonia trigonalis Ameghino 1901

Extinct genus of mammals

Ernestokokenia is an extinct genus of mammal, belonging to the Didolodontidae. It lived during the Early Eocene and the Middle Eocene, and its fossils were discovered in South America.

== Description ==
This genus is only known from its teeth, and it is then impossible to reconstruct its exact appearance. From comparison with similar and better known animals such as Didolodus, its size is estimated between 60 centimeters and a meter long. Ernestokokenia was characterized by very simple molars and premolars, with a bunodont structure, similar to those of Didolodus. The upper third and fourth molar were differently shaped and lacked a mesostyle. The labial and lingual cingulum were well developed.

== Classification ==
Ernestokokenia was a member of the Didolodontidae, an enigmatic clade of south-american mammals typicals of the early Cenozoic, of uncertain relationships. The first fossils of this animal were found in the Chubut Province in Patagonia (Argentina), in soils dated from the Middle Eocene, and were described by Florentino Ameghino in 1901. The type species is Ernestokokenia nitida.

Ameghino described also Notoprotogonia patagonica and Euprotogonia trigonalis, later attributed to the genus by George Gaylord Simpson in 1948. In 1935, Simpson had described two other species, Ernestokokenia chaishoer and E. yurunhor, from the same Chubut Province, and from the Lower Eocene.

Other fossils dubiously attributed to the genus have been found in soils of the Upper Paleocene of Argentina and the Eocene of Chile.

== Bibliography ==
- C. d. Paula Couto. 1952. Fossil mammals from the beginning of the Cenozoic in Brazil. Condylarthra, Litopterna, Xenungulata, and Astrapotheria. Bulletin of the American Museum of Natural History 99(6):355-394
- R. Cifelli. 1983. The origin and affinities of the South American Condylarthra and early Tertiary Litopterna (Mammalia). American Museum Novitates 2772:1-49
- A. R. Wyss, M. A. Norell, M. J. Novacek and J. J. Flynn. 1992. New ?early Tertiary localities from the Chilean Andes. Journal of Vertebrate Paleontology 12(3 Supp.):61A
- J. N. Gelfo. 2010. The "condylarth" Didolodontidae from Gran Barranca: history of the bunodont South American mammals until the Eocene-Oligocene transition. In R. H. Madden, A. A. Carlini, M. G. Vucetich, R. F. Kay (eds.), The Paleontology of Gran Barranca: Evolution and Environmental Change through the Middle Cenozoic of Patagonia 130-142
- E. V. Oliveira and F. J. Goin. 2011. A reassessment of bunodont metatherians from the Paleogene of Itaborai (Brazil): Systematics and the age of the Itaborian SALMA. Revista Brasileira de Paleontologia 14(2):105-136
