= Paulogervaisia =

Paulogervaisia Temporal range: Middle Eocene ~42–40 Ma

Scientific classification
- Kingdom: Animalia
- Phylum: Chordata
- Class: Mammalia
- Family: †Didolodontidae
- Genus: †Paulogervaisia; Ameghino 1901

Type species
- Paulogervaisia inusta Ameghino, 1901

Species
- P. inusta Ameghino 1901; P. porca Ameghino 1901

Synonyms
- Paulogervaisia mamma Ameghino 1901; Lambdaconus porcus Ameghino 1901

Extinct genus of mammals

Paulogervaisia is an extinct genus of mammal, belonging to the family Didolodontidae. Its fossilized remains have been found in South America.

== Description ==
This genus is known only from fossilized teeth, and it is therefore impossible to reconstruct exactly its appearance. Compared with the remains of better known forms, such as its relative Didolodus, it can be inferred that Paulogervaisia could reach one meter in length. Paulogervaisia is characterized by a third upper molar as wide as the second, and by a metaconus in a more lingual position than the paracone. The mesostyle was smaller than in Didolodus. The third lower molar had an entoconid as large as the hypoconulid.

== Classification ==
Paulogervaisia is a member of the Didolodontidae, a mysterious clade of south american mammals from the early Cenozoic, whose exact relationships are not well known. The type species is Paulogervaisia inusta, described by Florentino Ameghino in 1901, based on fossilized remains from the Chubut Province of Argentina, in Patagonia. Ameghino described two other species from the same formation; Lambdaconus mamma and L. porca, now considered as part of Paulogervaisia, and the later as a synonym of the type species. Ameghino believed that Paulogervaisia was an archaic member of the Proboscideans, a sort of link between this group and the so-called "condylarths". It was George Gaylord Simpson who recognized it as didolodontid in 1948.

== Bibliography ==
- C. d. Paula Couto. 1952. Fossil mammals from the beginning of the Cenozoic in Brazil. Condylarthra, Litopterna, Xenungulata, and Astrapotheria. Bulletin of the American Museum of Natural History 99(6):355-394
- R. Cifelli. 1983. The origin and affinities of the South American Condylarthra and early Tertiary Litopterna (Mammalia). American Museum Novitates 2772:1-49
- J. N. Gelfo. 2010. The "condylarth" Didolodontidae from Gran Barranca: history of the bunodont South American mammals until the Eocene-Oligocene transition. In R. H. Madden, A. A. *Carlini, M. G. Vucetich, R. F. Kay (eds.), The Paleontology of Gran Barranca: Evolution and Environmental Change through the Middle Cenozoic of Patagonia 130-142
