= Molinodus =

Molinodus Temporal range: Early Paleocene ~66–61.6 Ma

Scientific classification
- Kingdom: Animalia
- Phylum: Chordata
- Class: Mammalia
- Family: †Kollpaniidae
- Genus: †Molinodus; Muizon & Marshall 1987

Type species
- Molinodus suarezi Muizon & Marshall, 1987

Species
- M. suarezi Muizon & Marshall 1987

Extinct genus of mammals

Molinodus is an extinct genus of mammal of uncertain affinities, whose fossils were found at Tiupampa, in Bolivia, in terrains dated from the Paleocene.

== Description ==
Molinodus had bunodont teeth, with low, rounded cusps indicating a fruit-based diet. The only fossils found of Molinodus were teeth fossils. Its size, despite a level of uncertainty due to the fragmentary nature of the remains, has been estimated to 18–30 centimeters, for approximately 250–500 grams.

== Classification ==
Molinodus may be the best known genus of placental mammals found at Tiumpampa. This genus has tentatively been referred to Mioclaenidae, a North American and European clade of so-called condylarths whose South American members are sometimes placed within their own family, Kollpaniidae. It is supposed that those South American ungulates were closely related to two groups of South American native ungulates, Litopterna, a group of large-sized ungulates, and Didolodontidae, a family of medium-sized frugivorous ungulates, known only from the Paleocene and Eocene . It is possible that both of these South American endemic groups evolved from ancestors that dispersed from North America.

== Bibliography ==
- Darin A. Croft, Illustrated by Velizar Simeonovski, Horned Armadillos and Rafting Monkeys- TheFascinating Fossil Mammals of South America, 2016.
