= Lamegoia =

Lamegoia Temporal range: Paleocene ~58–55 Ma

Scientific classification
- Kingdom: Animalia
- Phylum: Chordata
- Class: Mammalia
- Infraclass: Placentalia
- Family: †Didolodontidae
- Genus: †Lamegoia; Paula Couto 1952

Type species
- Lamegoia conodonta Paula Couto, 1952

Species
- L. conodonta Paula Couto 1952

Extinct genus of mammals

Lamegoia is an extinct genus of mammals, belonging to the family Didolodontidae. It contains a single species, Lamegoia conodonta, which lived during the Late Paleocene in what is now South America.

== Description ==
This animal is only known from a few fossil teeth, so reconstructing its appearance is impossible. From comparison with some of his relatives, it is assumed it may have been 75 centimeters long. Lamegoia was characterized by bunodont teeth, quite similar to Didolodus but more archaic; the lower molars possessed a complete trigonid.

== Classification ==
Lamegoia is a member of the Didolodontidae, a badly known clade of south-american mammals from the early Cenozoic. Lamegoia conodonta was described in 1952 by Carlos de Paula Couto, over fossilized teeth found near São José de Itaborai in Brazil.

== Paleobiology ==
Lamegoia possessed transversal and highly wavy Hunter-Schreger bands (structures present on the teeth, used for strengthening the enamel; other mammals of similar size from the Itaboraí Formation possessed vertical bands. It is supposed that this characteristic was a functional adaptation to a certain type of vegetation, that the bunodont dentition of Lamegoia was able to process.
