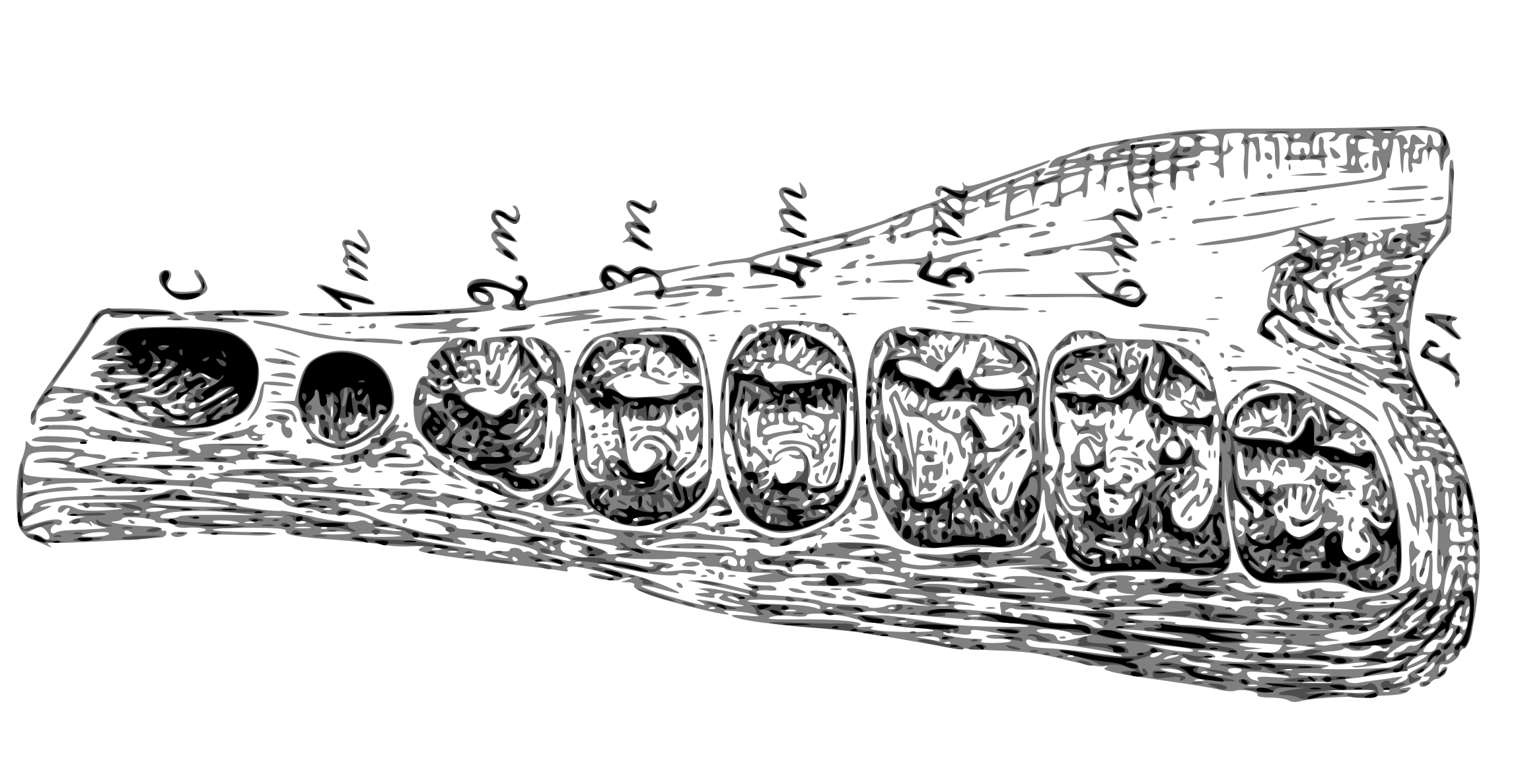
- Didolodus

Scientific classification
- Kingdom: Animalia
- Phylum: Chordata
- Class: Mammalia
- Clade: †Meridiungulata
- Family: †Didolodontidae; Savage, 1951

Genera
- †Didolodus; †Ernestokokenia; †Escribania; †Lamegoia; †Paulogervaisia; †Raulvaccia; †Ricardocifellia; †Saltaodus; †Umayodus

= Didolodontidae =

Didolodontidae Temporal range: Selandian–Priabonian

Extinct family of mammals

Didolodontidae is a possibly paraphyletic family of "condylarth" mammals known from the Paleogene of South America, with most specimens known from Argentina. They were generally small-medium in body size, and had a bunodont dentition. A close relationship with litopterns has been suggested by some studies. They range in age from the early Paleocene (Selandian/Peligran) to late Eocene (Priabonian/Mustersan). The attribution of Salladolodus deuterotheroides from the Late Oligocene of Bolivia to the family is doubtful.
