= Itaboraí =

- Municipality
- Município de Itaboraí
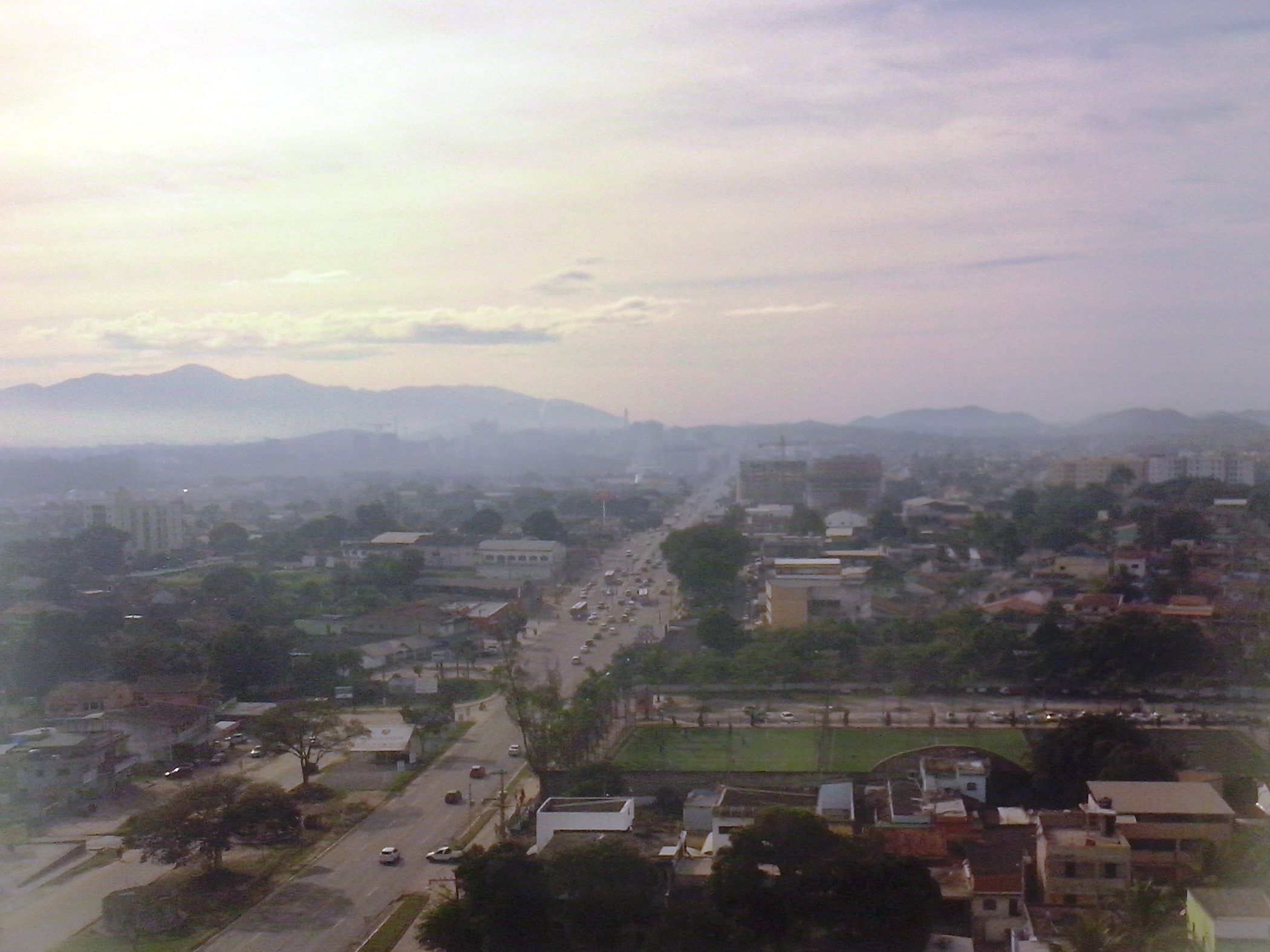
- Downtown

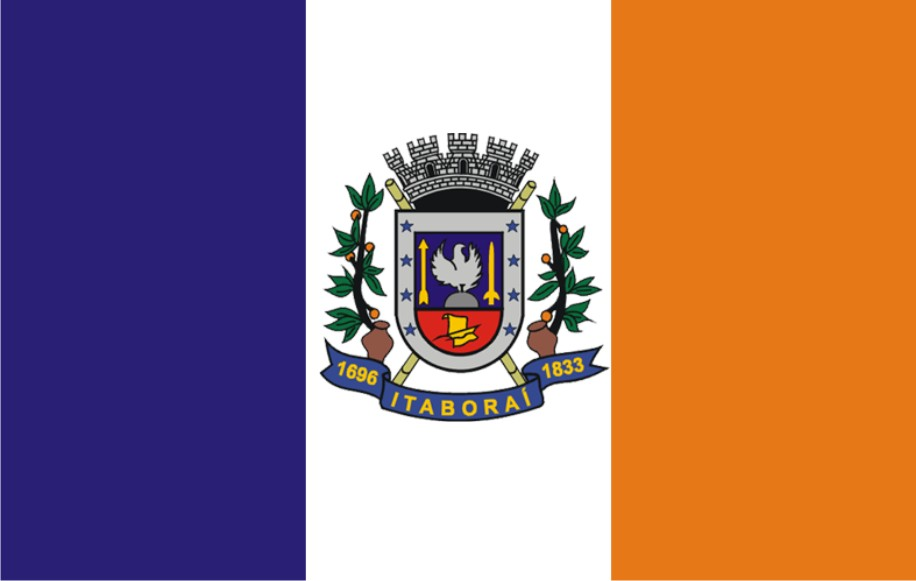
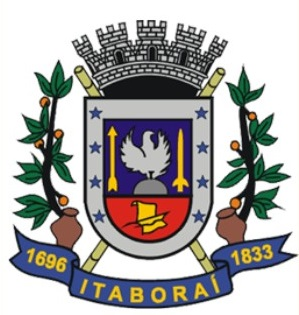
- Flag Coat of arms

- Location of Itaboraí in the state of Rio de Janeiro

- Location of Itaboraí in Brazil
- Coordinates: 22°44′38″S 42°51′32″W
- Country: Brazil
- Region: Southeast
- State: Rio de Janeiro

Government
  - Prefeito: Marcelo Delaroli

Area
  - Total: 430.375 km^{2} (166.169 sq mi)
- Elevation: 17 m (56 ft)

Population (2022 Brazilian census)
  - Total: 224,267
  - Estimate (2025): 240,127
  - Density: 521.097/km^{2} (1,349.63/sq mi)
- Time zone: UTC−3 (BRT)

Itaboraí (pronounced [itɐboɾaˈi] it-ə-BOR-ə-EE) is a city in the state of Rio de Janeiro, Brazil, which belongs to the Rio de Janeiro metropolitan area. It was founded in 1672. In 2025, it had a population of 240,127.

Around the year 1000, Tupi-speaking peoples from the valleys of the Madeira and Xingu rivers, on the right bank of the Amazon River, invaded most of the current Brazilian coast, expelling its previous inhabitants, speakers of languages belonging to the Macro-Jê linguistic trunk, to the interior of the continent. In the 16th century, when the Portuguese arrived in the Guanabara Bay region, it was occupied by one of these Tupi peoples: the Tupinambás, also called Tamoios.

== Geography ==
=== Location ===
Culturally, its closest municipalities are São Gonçalo and Niterói, connected to them by the Niterói-Manilha highway. It is officially planned since the start of the last President Lula's and Governor Sérgio Cabral's terms to be further connected to them and to Rio de Janeiro's downtown by the Line 3 of the Rio de Janeiro Metro, that will have the first submarine tunnel ever built in Brazil.

It is geographically close to Rio de Janeiro's airport and a SuperVia train line, but the poor infrastructure dedicated to the cities of Magé, Guapimirim and Itaboraí creates a significant gap between this area and the Baixada Fluminense, so that it is much easier for one use them with the public transit/highway routes from Mangaratiba, many kilometers more away, and most people who want to drive west go for the São Gonçalo-Niterói-Rio de Janeiro route instead.

Itaboraí, 1956. National Archives of Brazil.

It borders counter-clockwise São Gonçalo, Maricá, Tanguá, Rio Bonito, Cachoeiras de Macacu and Guapimirim, the last five have tourism as the greatest source of their income. It has a small coastline, mostly representing mangrove on the shores of polluted rivers' ends, that even though is the most preserved of the Baía de Guanabara. Itaboraí has one of the fastest-growing economies of the metropolitan area of Rio de Janeiro since mid-2000s, related to the chemistry and petroleum industries, and the related civil construction, housing and services to accommodate the new wave of workers, but the infrastructure was not prepared for this, what resulted in the symptoms of overgrowth the city now sees.

The municipality contains part of the 19,508-hectare (48,210-acre) Bacia do Rio Macacu Environmental Protection Area, created in 2002. It contains 36% of the 1,936-hectare (4,780-acre) Guanabara Ecological Station, created in 2006. It contains part of the Central Rio de Janeiro Atlantic Forest Mosaic of conservation units, created later in 2006.

The city is the namesake of the Itaboraian period.

== See also ==
- Cabuçu
