= Aristotle and the Gun and Other Stories =

2002 collection of short stories by L. Sprague de Camp

- Cover of first edition.
- Author: L. Sprague de Camp
- Cover artist: Ken Barr
- Language: English
- Genre: Science fiction and fantasy
- Publisher: Gale Group
- Publication date: 2002
- Publication place: United States
- Media type: Print (hardback)
- Pages: 240
- ISBN: 0-7862-4311-2
- OCLC: 49712234
- Dewey Decimal: 813/.52 21
- LC Class: PS3507.E2344 A85 2002

Aristotle and the Gun and Other Stories is a collection of short stories by American science fiction and fantasy author L. Sprague de Camp. It was published in hardcover in August 2002 by the Gale Group as part of its Five Star Speculative Fiction Series.

The book contains short works of fiction by the author spanning much of his writing career, having originally been published from 1939 to 1993. It also contains an introduction by Harry Turtledove.

== Contents ==
- "Introduction" by Harry Turtledove
- "Aristotle and the Gun"
- "The Gnarly Man"
- "A Gun for Dinosaur" (a Reginald Rivers time travel story)
- "The Honeymoon Dragon" (a Reginald Rivers time travel story)
- "The Mislaid Mastodon" (a Reginald Rivers time travel story)
- "Nothing in the Rules"
- "Two Yards of Dragon" (a Eudoric Dambertson fantasy)

== Reception ==
Don D'Ammassa wrote that the collection "includes some of his best stories," particularly the title story and "The Gnarly Man," noting that while all "are quite finely told ... none are the equal of the first two."

Roland Green called it a "high-quality volume" of "vintage short pieces," singling out "A Gun for Dinosaur," "The Gnarly Man," "Two Yards of Dragon," the title story, and "one of the classics of sf/fantasy humor, 'Nothing in the Rules,'" for particular mention. He also praised the introduction by Harry Turtledove, "who is the closest thing to a still-writing de Camp," as "match[ing] the stories in outstanding merit." Assessing the collection's worth for libraries, he advised them to "[c]onsider this a necessary acquisition wherever all these stories aren't otherwise and for sure in the collection. And let there be more and more of their fellows, until all the de Camps' many well-chosen words are again available."

Guy Soffer characterized the book as "a very nice presentation of L. Sprague de Camp's style, which blends fantasy and science fiction," and its stories as "fairly short, very readable and mostly also very funny." In his survey of the stories, he commended the irony in "The Gnarly Man," the humor in "Nothing in the Rules" and "Two Yards of Dragon," and finds the Reginald Rivers stories "fascinating." Overall, he felt de Camp "manages to paint a believable picture and wrap it up in a scientifically conceivable way," and recommended it "as light reading, suitable for readers of all ages."

Tom Easton, recalling the author as "always one of my favorite SF&F writers," urged de Camp's "many fans [to] get a copy," and predicted it should set any "not already a fan ... to looking for such gems as The Incomplete Enchanter, Lest Darkness Fall, and more." He called the title story "a classic exposition of the time-travel paradox," and assessed "A Gun for Dinosaur" as a classic as well.
