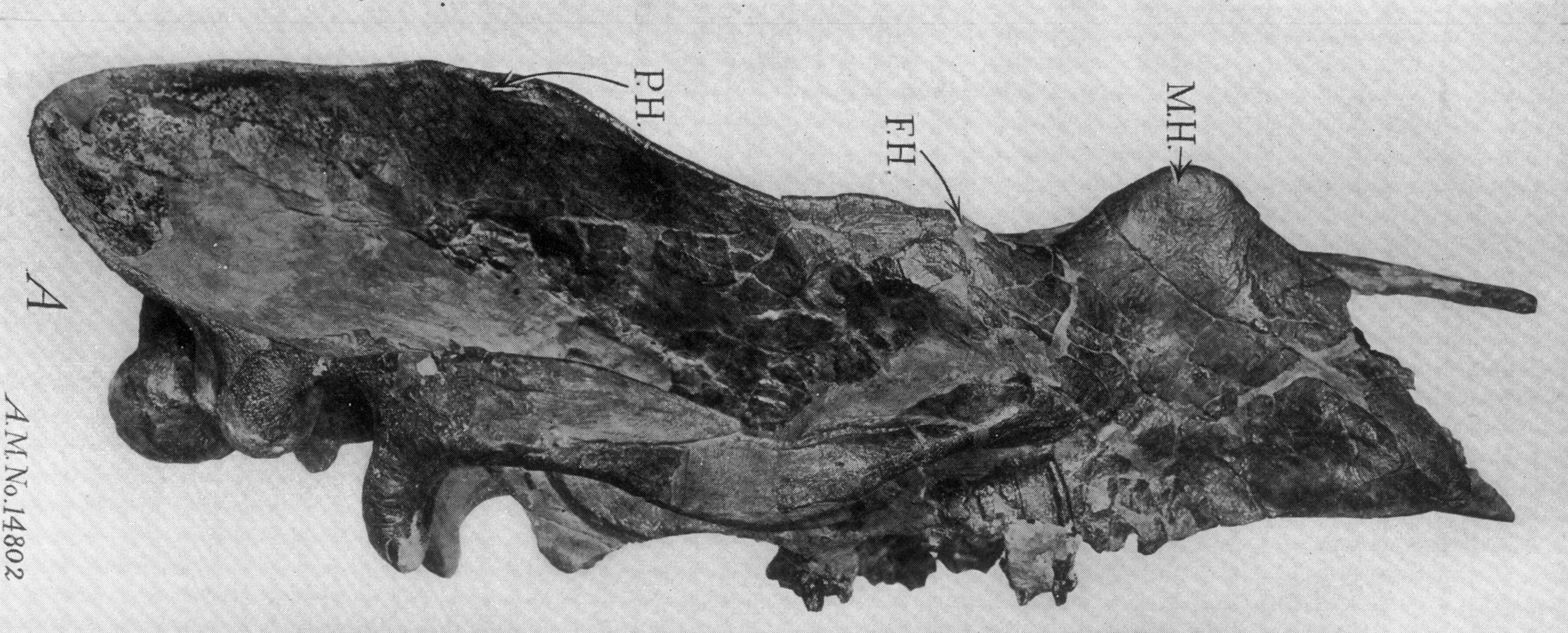
- Bathyopsis fissidens skull

Scientific classification
- Kingdom: Animalia
- Phylum: Chordata
- Class: Mammalia
- Order: †Dinocerata
- Family: †Uintatheriidae
- Subfamily: †Uintatheriinae
- Genus: †Bathyopsis; Cope, 1881

Type species
- †Bathyopsis fissidens

Species
- †B. fissidens (Cope, 1881); †B. middleswarti (Wheeler, 1961)

= Bathyopsis =

Bathyopsis Temporal range: Early Eocene–Mid Eocene

Extinct North American mammal

Bathyopsis, from Ancient Greek βαθύς (bathús), meaning "thick", and ὄψις (ópsis), meaning "face", is an extinct genus of dinocerates. The genus is known from Eocene North America.

== Description ==
=== Crania ===
Bathyopsis is intermediate, morphologically, from the basal Prodinoceras and Probathyopsis (part of the family Prodinoceratidae) and the later dinocerate genera Tetheopsis and Eobasileus. Bathyopsis possesses small cranial horns, one pair being on the maxilla, another pair on the frontal, and a pair on the parietal. The genus lacks any upper incisors, but has greatly enlarged canines. Molar-wise, Bathyopsis is similar to Uintatherium in morphology, and the molars are less elongate than those in Probathyopsis. The mandible bears a large flange, much like other uintatheriines. The skull has been described as dolichocephalic.

=== Postcrania ===
The limb structure is graviportal and digitigrade, indicating an increase in size compared to earlier dinocerates.

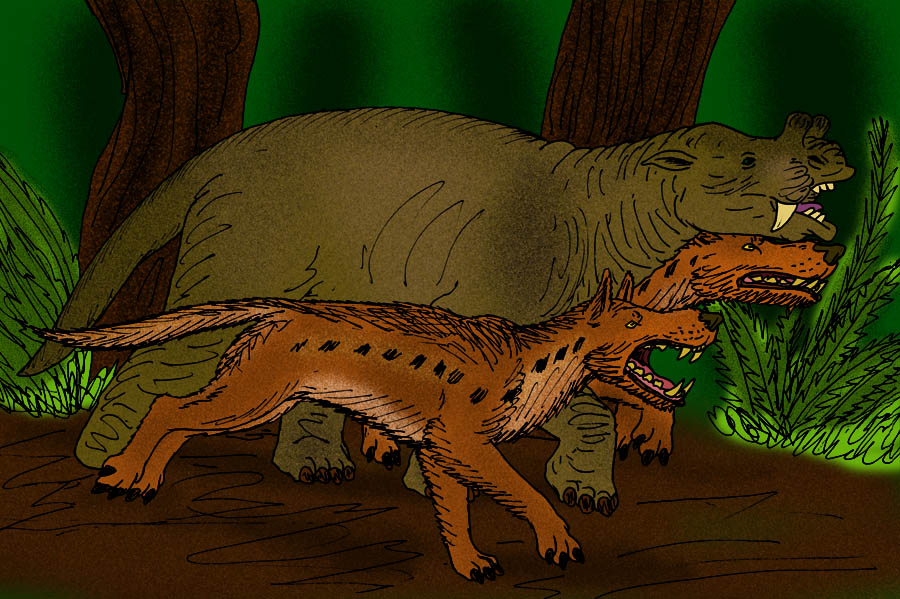
Bathyopsis fissidens

== Classification ==
Historically, Bathyopsis had also been assigned to the Pantodonta, though this is not supported. Bathyopsis is considered a sister group to the other uintatheriines on the basis that it bears much smaller cranial horns and is generally smaller than the other uintatheriines. In the past, Bathyopsis had been ascribed to both a separate family (Bathyopsidae), by Henry Fairfield Osborn, and a subfamily of its own, (Bathyopsinae), by Wheeler in 1961. This decision, however, was reversed by Schoch and Lucas in 1985, who established the (now disused) tribe Bathyopsini. There is an indeterminate species of Bathyopsis known from a singular premolar, which resembles Probathyopsis in shape.

Phylogeny in accordance with Scott et al. (1998):

- Prodinoceras
- - Gobiatherium
  - - Bathyopsis
    - - Uintatherium
      - - Tetheopsis
        - Eobasileus
