= Bring the Light =

Bring the Light may refer to:

- "Bring the Light", a song by The Smashing Pumpkins from their 2007 album Zeitgeist
- "Bring the Light" (Beady Eye song), the 2010 debut single by Beady Eye
- "To Bring the Light", Science Fiction story by David Drake, published in "Lest Darkness Fall and Related Stories"
- Bring the Light, Canadian hardcore band formed by ex-members of Subb
