= Aristotle and the Gun =

- Short story by L. Sprague de Camp
- Frank Kelly Freas's illustration of the story in Astounding Science-Fiction
- Country: United States
- Language: English
- Genre: Science fiction

Publication
- Published in: Astounding Science-Fiction
- Media type: Print (Magazine)
- Publication date: February, 1958

"Aristotle and the Gun" is a time travel and alternate history science fiction story by American writer L. Sprague de Camp.

== Publication history ==
The story was first published in the magazine Astounding Science-Fiction for February, 1958, and first appeared in book form in de Camp's collection A Gun for Dinosaur and Other Imaginative Tales (Doubleday, 1963). It later appeared in the paperback edition of the collection published by Curtis Books in 1969, and the subsequent de Camp collections Aristotle and the Gun and Other Stories (Five Star, 2002), and Years in the Making: the Time-Travel Stories of L. Sprague de Camp (NESFA Press, 2005), as well as the anthologies Alpha Three (Ballantine Books, 1972), Space Mail, Volume II (Fawcett Crest, 1982), Analog: Writers' Choice (Davis Publications, 1983, Robert Adams' Book of Alternate Worlds (Signet Books, 1987), The Legend Book of Science Fiction (Legend, 1991), Modern Classics of Science Fiction (St. Martin's Press, 1992), Roads Not Taken: Tales of Alternate History (Del Rey Books, 1998), and Futures Past (Ace Books, 2006). The first stand-alone edition of the story was published in paperback by Positronic Publishing in April, 2013. The story has also been translated into German.

== Plot summary ==
The lonely and misanthropic scientist Sherman Weaver has a central role in a secret US government project to build a time machine. The project succeeds, and a prototype device is constructed. However, before it can be tested, the government, alarmed at Weaver's report that small changes in history might have profound consequences and completely change the present-day world, decides to abort the project. Weaver is ordered to dismantle the machine, but rather than obey, he takes matters into his own hands by using the machine to project himself back to the era of Philip II of Macedon. There, he hopes to meet Aristotle.

Believing that the influential ancient philosopher's lack of interest in experiment retarded scientific progress through much of subsequent history, Weaver aims to nudge the savant in what he considers the proper direction. His intention is to create a different 20th century dominated by super-science, hundreds of years in advance of ours.

Weaver pretends to be a conventional traveler from India. Equipped with modern marvels, he attempts to demonstrate to his new acquaintance, Aristotle, the value of experimentation in furtherance of knowledge. His task is complicated by the malicious mischief of Aristotle's students, the coterie of young Prince Alexander (subsequently Alexander the Great), and by coming under suspicion of being a spy for the Great King of Persia against whom Philip is preparing to go to war. Ultimately forced to defend himself with a handgun he has brought, Weaver is on the point of being executed for espionage and murder, but he is snapped back into the present, as the effects of his time projection wear off.

Weaver finds himself in a world very different from the one he left but not in the way he hoped. Aristotle, convinced that the tedious accumulation of experimental knowledge is beneath the dignity of civilized philosophers and that it is a waste of time attempting to catch up to "India" in that regard, turns out to have come down strongly against the notion in his writings. The result is a backward present of petty states, roughly at the level of late medieval principalities in our own history, considerably behind Weaver's original timeline in technology. His own United States is not even a dream, with its physical confines being controlled by various Amerindian nations influenced by the civilization of the Old World but having long since thrown off any subjection to it. Enslaved in one such state, Weaver is delivered from endless drudgery only after many years, when his scholarly talents are finally recognized.

The narrative of the story is set forth by Weaver in a lengthy letter to an acquaintance curious about his remarkable background, in which he concludes that he would have done better to leave well enough alone.

== Reception ==
Critic P. Schuyler Miller called the story "even better" than de Camp's "A Gun for Dinosaur" in its recreation of Aristotle's Macedonia as seen through modern eyes, and its twist in the alternate time-track theme." Don D'Ammassa rated the piece one of de Camp's "best stories", and placed it among those "of particular note" among de Camp's "many memorable short stories." Roland Green, writing for Booklist, called it of "outstanding merit" and one of the author's "vintage short pieces." To Tom Easton, it "is a classic exposition of the time-travel paradox," and de Camp "always one of my favorite SF&F writers." Harry Turtledove called the story "a fine specimen of the for-want-of-a-nail story: a small change in the past producing enormous ramifications as the centuries roll by," with "things [not] so easy as the [protagonist] thought they would be ... a common theme in de Camp's work."

== Importance ==
"Aristotle and the Gun" is one of de Camp's most notable works. Like his first significant work of alternate history, the novel Lest Darkness Fall (1939), the story posits a world changed as the result of time travel, and like his other major work in the field, "The Wheels of If" (1940) it reveals the long-term consequences of the historical change.

For de Camp himself, however, its publication marked the beginning of a lengthy departure from the science fiction field, and pointed the way to the historical novels of the ancient world he would write during the next ten years, beginning with An Elephant for Aristotle (1958), which serves as an interesting counterpoint to the present story. The development is indeed to some degree foreshadowed in the present story itself, with its meticulously researched depiction of the Classical Greek and Hellenistic milieu for which de Camp clearly had strong interest and empathy and also when seen through the eyes of its own native-born denizens and without a time traveler in attendance. De Camp would write no more science fiction until 1977.
