= Dinosaurs (1996 anthology) =

- Cover of first edition
- Editor: Martin H. Greenberg
- Language: English
- Genre: Science fiction
- Publisher: Donald I. Fine
- Publication date: 1996
- Publication place: United States
- Media type: Print (hardcover)
- Pages: xi, 288 pp.
- ISBN: 1-55611-482-6

Dinosaurs is an anthology of science fiction short works edited by Martin H. Greenberg. It was first published in hardcover by Donald I. Fine in February 1996, with a second edition issued by Niagara/Ulverscroft in October of the same year.

The book collects fourteen novelettes and short stories by various authors, together with an introduction by Robert Silverberg.

== Contents ==
- "Introduction" (Robert Silverberg)
- "The Fog Horn" (Ray Bradbury)
- "Day of the Hunters" (Isaac Asimov)
- "Dino Trend" (Pat Cadigan)
- "Time's Arrow" (Arthur C. Clarke)
- "Chameleon" (Kristine Kathryn Rusch)
- "Shadow of a Change" (Michelle M. Sagara)
- "Strata" (Edward Bryant)
- "Green Brother" (Howard Waldrop)
- "Wildcat" (Poul Anderson)
- "Just Like Old Times" (Robert J. Sawyer)
- "The Last Thunder Horse West of the Mississippi" (Sharon N. Farber)
- "Hatching Season" (Harry Turtledove)
- "A Gun for Dinosaur" (L. Sprague de Camp)
- "Our Lady of the Sauropods" (Robert Silverberg)
