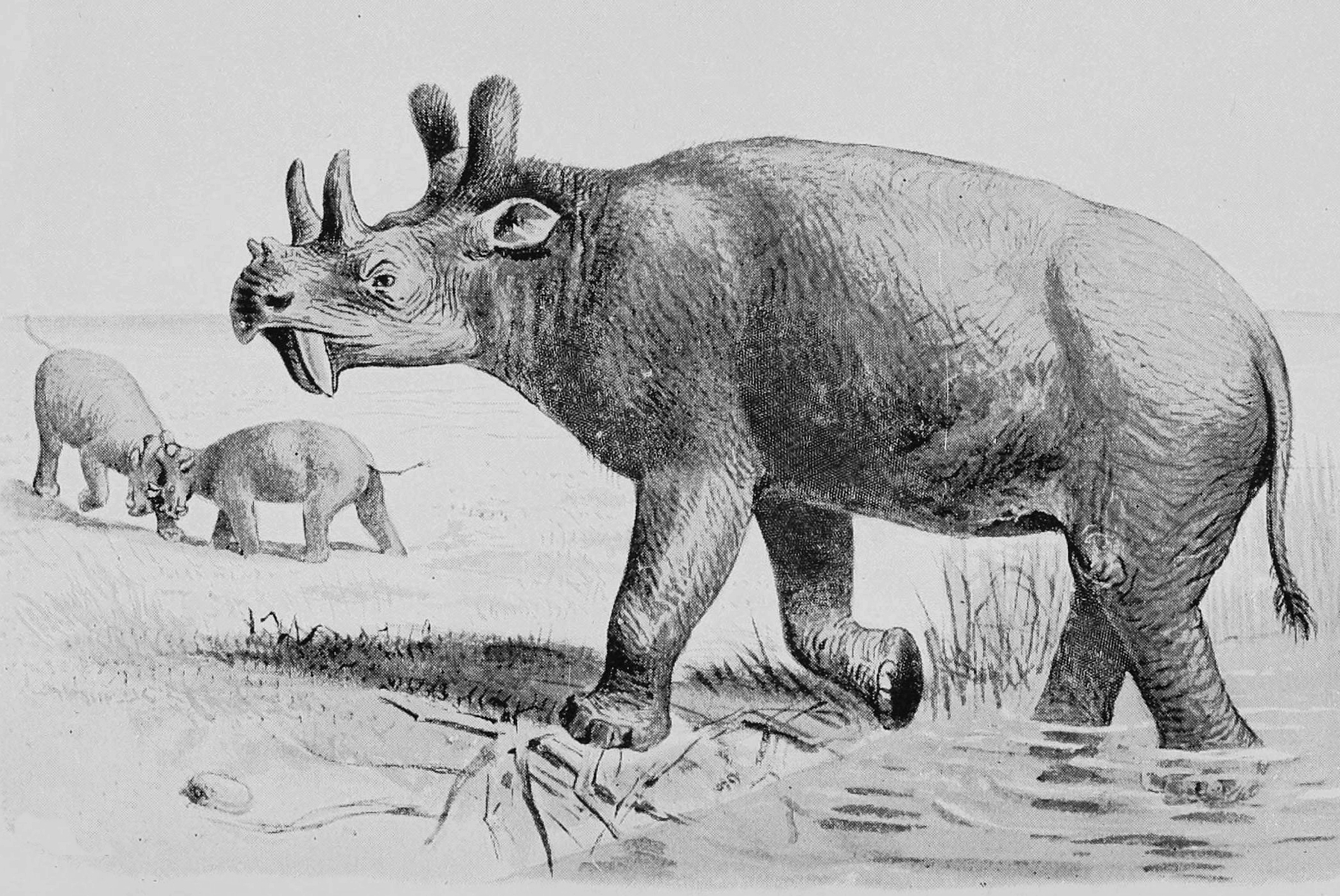
- Tetheopsis ingens

Scientific classification
- Kingdom: Animalia
- Phylum: Chordata
- Class: Mammalia
- Order: †Dinocerata
- Family: †Uintatheriidae
- Subfamily: †Uintatheriinae
- Genus: †Tetheopsis; Cope, 1885

Species
- T. stenops (Marsh, 1885); T. ingens (Marsh, 1885); T. speirianus (Osborn, 1881)

Synonyms
- Tinoceras stenops (Marsh, 1885); Tinoceras ingens (Marsh, 1885); Loxolophodon speirianus (Osborn, 1881)

= Tetheopsis =

Tetheopsis Temporal range: Middle Eocene–Late Eocene

Extinct genus of dinocerate mammal

Tetheopsis is an extinct genus of dinocerates from Eocene North America. The name of the genus derives from the Greek "tethe" (meaning "grandmother") and "opsis" (meaning "appearance"). Tetheopsis has only been found in the Washakie Basin, with all specimens being found on or near Haystack Mountain.

== Description ==
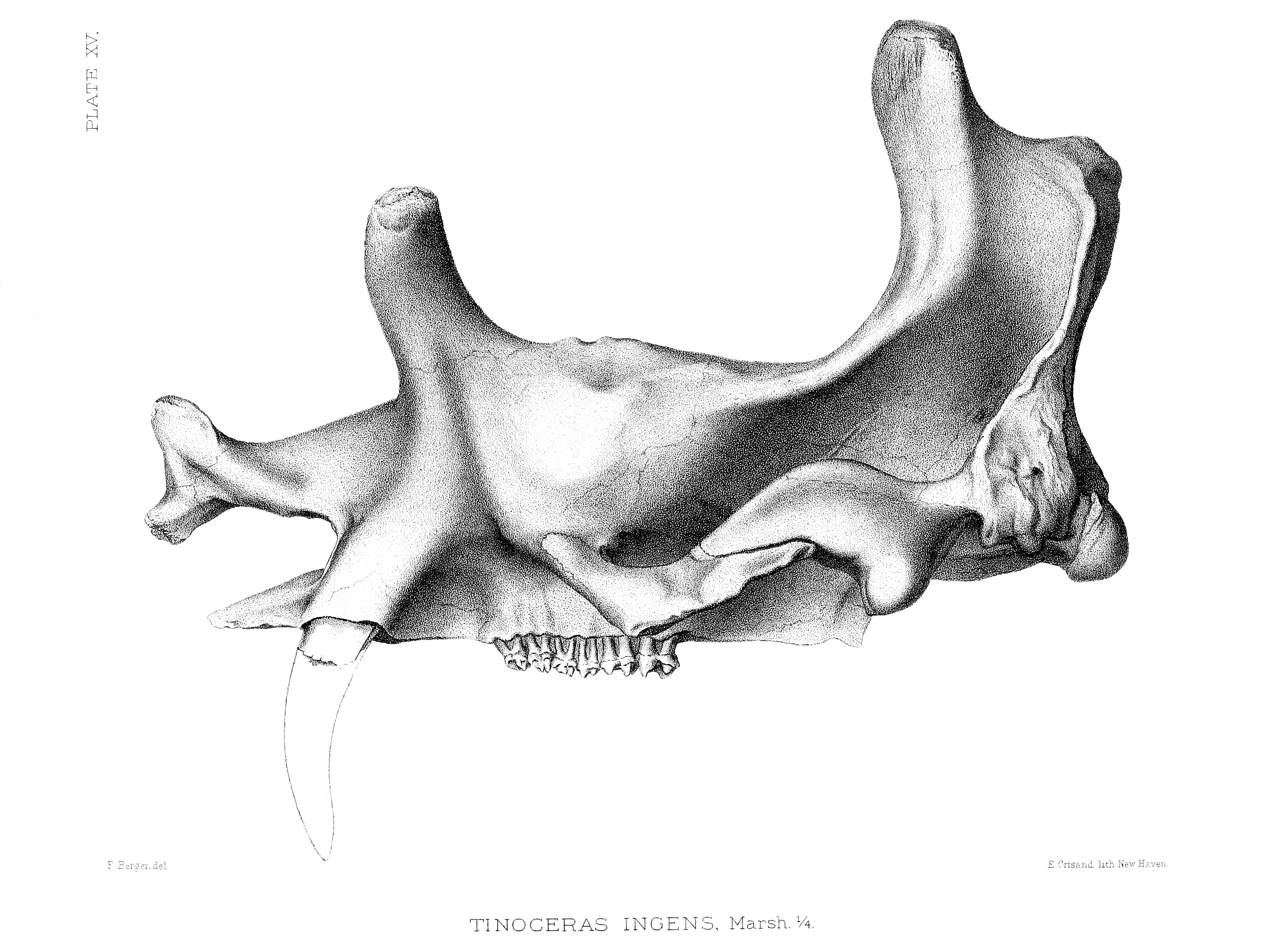
Skull of Tetheopsis ingens

Tetheopsis resembles other large dinocerates like Uintatherium and Eobasileus in general morphology, but differs in skull proportions. The parietal horn is located near the occiput, and the maxillary horn is situated above the diastema (tooth gap). The genus bears the prominent canines typical of the derived uintatheriids.

== Classification ==
Tetheopsis has been suggested to be a synonym of the related genus Eobasileus by some authors, though there is a lack of sufficient research to fully synonymize the genus.

The below cladogram is based on the work of Scott and colleagues (1998):

- Prodinoceras
- - Gobiatherium
  - - Bathyopsis
    - - Uintatherium
      - - Tetheopsis
        - Eobasileus
