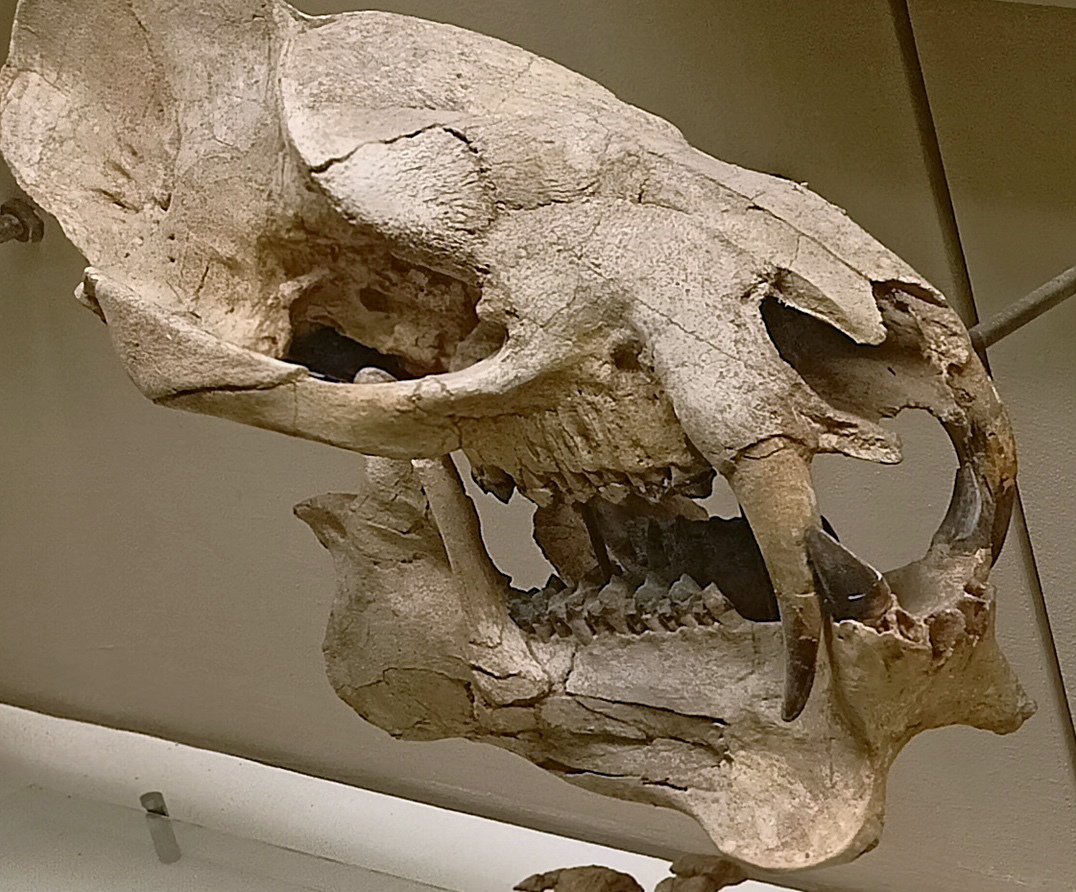
- Skull of Prodinoceras martyr

Scientific classification
- Kingdom: Animalia
- Phylum: Chordata
- Class: Mammalia
- Order: †Dinocerata
- Family: †Prodinoceratidae
- Genus: †Prodinoceras; Matthew, Granger & Simpson, 1929

Species
- P. diconicus (Tong, 1978); P. martyr (Matthew et al, 1929)

Synonyms
- Mongolotherium (Flerov, 1952); Jiaoluotherium (Tong, 1978); Houyanotherium (Tong, 1978); Phenaceras (Tong, 1979); Ganatherium (Tong, 1979); Pyrodon (Zhai, 1978)

= Prodinoceras =

Prodinoceras Temporal range: Late Paleocene–Early Eocene

Extinct genus of dinocerate mammal

Prodinoceras, from Ancient Greek πρό (pró), meaning "before", δεινός (deinós), meaning "terrible", and κέρας (kéras), meaning "horn", is the earliest known dinocerate genus, which lived in the late Paleocene of Mongolia.

== Description ==
Prodinoceras was rather large, reaching 2.9 m (9 ft 6 in) in length. It is also regarded as the most basal uintathere, as, although it had the characteristic fang-like tusks, it had yet to evolve the characteristic knob-like horns. The genus also bears 3 upper incisors, a trait lacking in later dinocerates. The astragalus also possesses a distinct neck and the trochlear facet is not expanded.

== Classification ==
Prodinoceras possesses traits that indicate it is a sister group to the other derived dinocerates. Most literature posits Prodinoceras and Probathyopsis as close relatives.

Phylogeny of dinocerates, in accordance with Scott et al.

- Prodinoceras
- - Gobiatherium
  - - Bathyopsis
    - - Uintatherium
      - - Tetheopsis
        - Eobasileus
