= Lest Darkness Fall and Related Stories =

- Cover of first edition
- Author: L. Sprague de Camp and others
- Language: English
- Genre: Science fiction
- Publisher: Phoenix Pick
- Publication date: 2011
- Publication place: United States
- Media type: Print (paperback)
- Pages: 287 pp.
- ISBN: 978-1-61242-015-8

Lest Darkness Fall and Related Stories is an anthology of time travel alternate history stories by American writers L. Sprague de Camp, Frederik Pohl, S. M. Stirling and David Drake. It was first published in ebook by Arc Manor under its Phoenix Pick imprint in February 2011, with a trade paperback following in March of the same year and a hardcover edition in October 2017. Arc Manor issued a second edition under its CAEZIK SF & Fantasy imprint in hardcover and ebook in February 2021, under the alternate title Lest Darkness Fall and Timeless Tales Written in Tribute; the new edition added two newly commissioned stories by David Weber and Harry Turtledove.

== Summary ==
The book collects de Camp's classic novel Lest Darkness Fall, an afterword concerning its significance by Alexei and Cory Panshin, and tales responding to it by the other authors.

== Contents ==
- Lest Darkness Fall by L. Sprague de Camp. A shorter version first appeared in the magazine Unknown v. 11, no. 4, December 1939; expanded to novel length, it was first published in book form by Henry Holt and Company in 1941. There have been numerous editions since. Martin Padway, an American archeologist visiting Rome in 1938, is struck by lightning at the Pantheon and finds himself transported back in time to the Rome of 535 AD. In that period the Western Roman Empire has long since fallen, and for nearly sixty years Italy has been ruled by barbarians, currently the Ostrogoths. However, the Eastern Roman or Byzantine Empire is poised to invade and reconquer the peninsula in a ruinous war Padway knows from history will devastate the country and mark the onset of the Dark Ages. To ensure his own survival and prevent the impending collapse of civilization, he sets out to introduce technical innovations from his own time. As Italy is invaded, he also becomes involved in political and military affairs, becoming the power behind the Ostrogothic throne and defeating the Byzantines. By the end of the novel Padway has stabilized the Italo-Gothic kingdom and consolidated his reforms. Due to his actions, Europe will not experience the Dark Ages, and darkness will not fall.
- "L. Sprague de Camp's Great Leap of Imagination" by Alexei and Cory Panshin. The Panshins' afterword was adapted from material on de Camp in The World Beyond the Hill, their 1989 history of the science fiction field through the golden age.
- "The Deadly Mission of Phineas Snodgrass" by Frederik Pohl first appeared in Galaxy Magazine v. 20, no. 5, June 1962. In this tale, the title character travels back to 1 BC and teaches modern medicine, causing a population explosion. It ends with the fantastically overpopulated alternate timeline sending someone back to assassinate Snodgrass, allowing darkness to fall for thankful trillions.
- "The Apotheosis of Martin Padway" by S. M. Stirling, first appeared in Harry Turtledove's 2005 tribute anthology honoring L. Sprague de Camp, The Enchanter Completed. A direct sequel to Lest Darkness Fall, it provides interesting glimpses of what might have become of the reality Padway altered, both during his old age and a few hundred years later. By 585 A.D., fifty years since Padway came on the scene, a full-fledged Industrial Revolution is taking place, centered on Italy but fast spreading elsewhere; the Western Roman Empire has been revived under the Gothic Emperors, fully regaining all its European territories and embarking on the colonization of North America - with a political and economic situation roughly comparable to 19th Century Britain. Padway, in his eighties, is still the highly energetic power behind the throne. But to the east, the Byzantine Empire had kept pace, obtained for itself the new firearms "invented" by Padway, embarked on massive conquests all the way to Sogdiana (Afghanistan) and the persecution of Zoroastrians and Buddhists - and still entertains schemes of westward conquest. Byzantine agents, infiltrating the western capital Florence, embark on a mass campaign of riots and sabotage. Some of them pursue Padway, whom they find in a carriage with his favorite granddaughter. Escaping into an abandoned building and chased by a Byzantine-led mob, Padway decides to sacrifice himself, letting a young officer take the granddaughter to safety while the Byzantines start a fire which seems set to roast Padway within minutes - but time travelers from the further future save him in a very spectacular way, the Apotheosis of the title. Once inside their timeship, Padway discovers that they came from the Tenth Century - not the Viking Age Tenth Century with which Padway was familiar, but rather a Tenth Century possessing a super-science far beyond the Twentieth Century from which Padway originally came. His effort to change history was a success far greater than he ever dared dream.
- "To Bring the Light" by David Drake, originally published together with de Camp's novel in the 1996 Baen double Lest Darkness Fall / To Bring The Light. This story features Flavia Herosilla, a well-educated woman living in Imperial Rome, watching a procession headed by the Emperor Philip the Arab - when a sudden thunderstorm breaks out. Like Padway, she is sent back in time by a lightning strike, in her case to the era of Rome's beginnings around 751 BC. It takes her some time to understand that the rolling green hills she sees are the Seven Hills of Rome, which she had known completely built up and covered with palaces and tenements. Among the rude shepherds living in a tiny village on top of Palatine Hill are people which she always considered as myth and whose historical veracity she had doubted. But they are all too real, one of them trying to rape her and needing to be fought off by tricks she had learned from a Bactrian wrestler. Finding her feet in this archaic setting, Flavia is able to use her sophisticated urban knowledge to manipulate and overawe the villagers, and is soon in a position to organize and implement a bloody regime change in Alba Longa - a minor provincial town by Flavia's Imperial Roman standards, but the crucial hub of local power in the here-and-now. Unlike Padway, who tried to change history, Flavia simply seeks to make sure that the Founding of Rome would take place on schedule and that the legends that she knows would come true. But there is one detail she does want to change. The legends tell that on the day of Rome's founding, Romulus killed his brother Remus - and while in the process of making sure that Rome will be founded, Flavia Herosilla had fallen in love with Remus.
- "Temporal Discontinuity" by David Weber (second edition only), newly commissioned for the second edition. Another direct sequel to Lest Darkness Fall, but incompatible with Stirling's "The Apotheosis of Martin Padway." This one also involves a future time-traveler investigating Padway's temporal disruptions, only she thinks he's a criminal from her own time who set out to change the timeline on purpose - a crime punishable by death. When agent Yawen Clasen-Hamatti confronts Padway in person, she discovers her mistake and has a moral dilemma on her hands.
- "The Fake Pandemic" by Harry Turtledove (second edition only), newly commissioned for the second edition. Also a direct sequel to Lest Darkness Fall, compatible with Stirling's but not Weber's. Padway recruits the Byzantine jurist Tribonian in an effort to prevent the Plague of Justinian. The story follows Tribonian as he proceeds to secure the emperor Justinian I's permission and support to do just that, and follows him on his successful if thankless mission (Justinian may be supportive, but he is far from grateful).
