= Science Fiction A to Z =

- Cover of first edition
- Editors: Isaac Asimov; Martin H. Greenberg; Charles G. Waugh
- Language: English
- Genre: Science fiction
- Published: 1982 (Houghton Mifflin)
- Publication place: United States
- Media type: Print (hardcover)
- Pages: xvii, 651 pp.
- ISBN: 0-395-31285-X

Science Fiction A to Z: A Dictionary of the Great S.F. Themes is an anthology of science fiction short stories edited by Isaac Asimov, Martin H. Greenberg and Charles G. Waugh. It was first published in hardcover by Houghton Mifflin in August 1982.

The book collects fifty novellas, novelettes and short stories by various science fiction authors, with an introduction by Asimov. The book is organized as a "Glossary of Terms Frequently Used in Science Fiction Stories," terms "science fictionish rather than scientific" that are "not generally found in ordinary reference books [or] scientific dictionaries. " The stories are arranged alphabetically by the terms they stories utilize or illustrate, and preceded by definitions of those terms.

== Contents ==
- "Dictionaries" [introduction] (Isaac Asimov)
- "Too Soon to Die" (Tom Godwin)
- "A Museum Piece" (Roger Zelazny)
- "Why Johnny Can't Speed" (Alan Dean Foster)
- "Man in a Quandary" (L. J. Stecher, Jr.)
- "The Cabbage Patch" (Theodore R. Cogswell)
- "A Touch of Grapefruit" (Richard Matheson)
- "Answer" (Fredric Brown)
- "A Gun for Dinosaur" (L. Sprague de Camp)
- "A Pail of Air" (Fritz Leiber)
- "The Odor of Thought" (Robert Sheckley)
- "The Last Monster" (Poul Anderson)
- "History Lesson" (Arthur C. Clarke)
- "The Troublemaker" (Christopher Anvil)
- "The Game of Rat and Dragon" (Cordwainer Smith)
- "Let's Be Frank" (Brian W. Aldiss)
- "The Easy Way Out" (Lee Correy)
- "All Cats Are Gray" (Andre Norton)
- "The Man from Earth" (Gordon R. Dickson)
- "Dream Damsel" (Evan Hunter)
- "The Underdweller" (William F. Nolan)
- "Top Secret" (Eric Frank Russell)
- "One Love Have I" (Robert F. Young)
- "The Snowball Effect" (Katherine MacLean)
- "The Santa Claus Problem" (J. W. Schutz)
- "The Ship Who Sang" (Anne McCaffrey)
- "No Harm Done" (Jack Sharkey)
- "There Will Come Soft Rains" (Ray Bradbury)
- "In the Jaws of Danger" (Piers Anthony)
- "In the Abyss" (H. G. Wells)
- "Custer's Last Jump" (Steven Utley and Howard Waldrop)
- "Game Preserve" (Rog Phillips)
- "Life Hutch" (Harlan Ellison)
- "The Silk and the Song" (Charles L. Fontenay)
- "Down to the Worlds of Men" (Alexei Panshin)
- "Robbie" (Isaac Asimov)
- "The Man with English" (Horace L. Gold)
- "Transstar" (Raymond E. Banks)
- "Open Warfare" (James E. Gunn)
- "The Long Way Home" (Fred Saberhagen)
- "Skirmish on a Summer Morning" (Bob Shaw)
- "Gantlet" (Richard E. Peck)
- "Saucer of Loneliness" (Theodore Sturgeon)
- "The Mother of Necessity" (Chad Oliver)
- "The Great Secret" (George H. Smith)
- "The Draw" (Jerome Bixby)
- "For the Sake of Grace" (Suzette Haden Elgin)
- "A Death in the House" (Clifford D. Simak)
- "Creature of the Snows" (William Sambrot)
- "A Criminal Act" (Harry Harrison)
- "The Cage" (A. Bertram Chandler)
