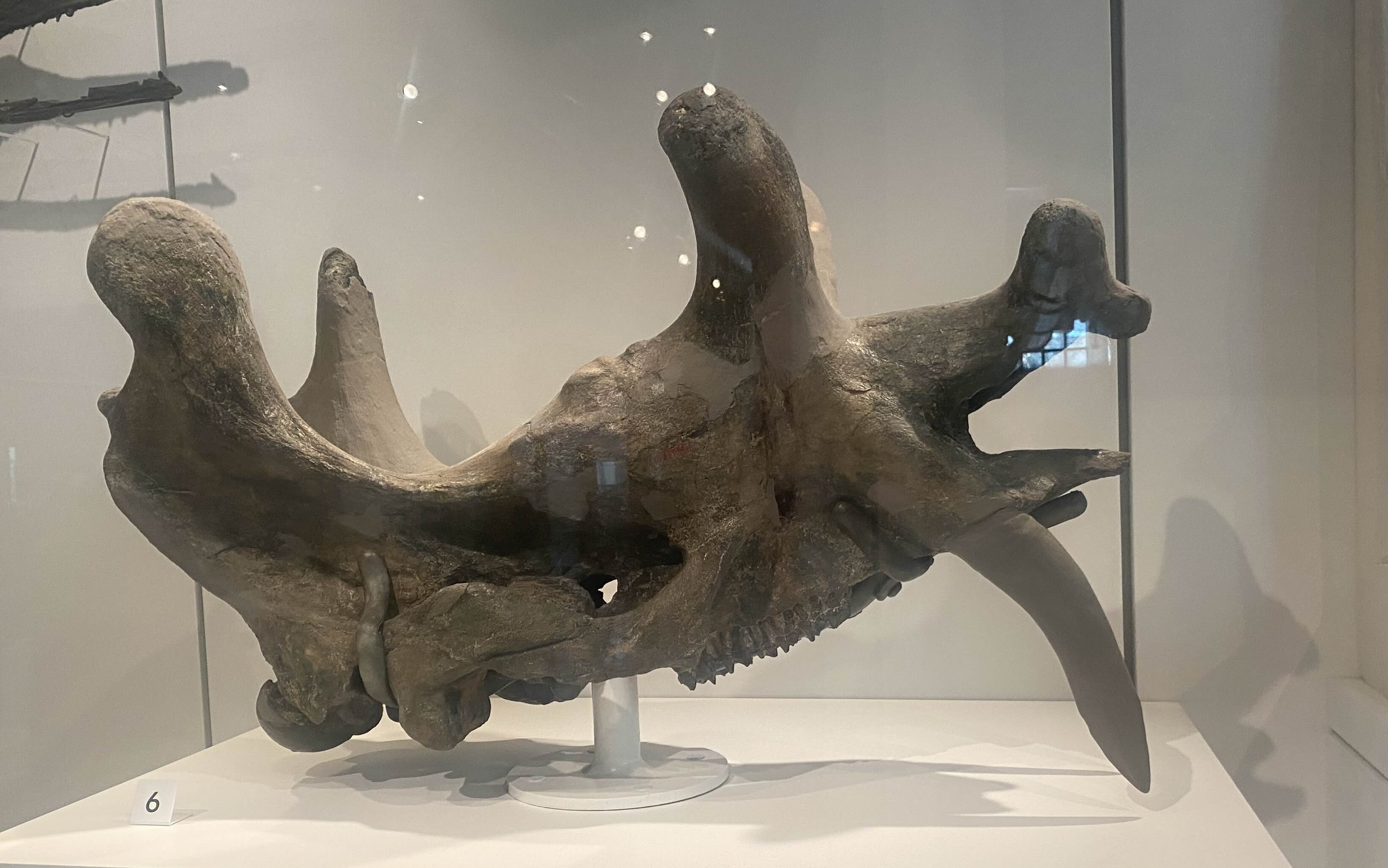
- A skull from the Yale Peabody Museum of Natural History

Scientific classification
- Kingdom: Animalia
- Phylum: Chordata
- Class: Mammalia
- Order: †Dinocerata
- Family: †Uintatheriidae
- Subfamily: †Uintatheriinae
- Genus: †Eobasileus; Cope, 1872
- Species: †E. cornutus

Binomial name
- †Eobasileus cornutus Cope, 1872

Synonyms
- Genus synonymy: Uintacolotherium Cook, 1926; Synonyms of E.cornutus: Loxolophodon cornutus Cope, 1872; Lephalaphodon discornatus Cope, 1872; Tinoceras cornutum Hay, 1902; Uintatherium cornutum Cope; Eobasileus uintensis Osborn, 1929; Tinoceras latum Marsh, 1885; Uintacolotherium blayneyi Cook, 1926

= Eobasileus =

Eobasileus Temporal range: Eocene Bridgerian to Uintan

Extinct genus of dinocerate mammal

Eobasileus ("dawn-king" (Note: In reference to a specimen he considered to be representative of a different species, Cope said, "King of living things at that dawn of tertiary time, I named him Eobasileus, and the species from its peculiar horns, Eosbasilius pressicornis.")) is a genus of dinoceratan mammal in the family Uintatheriidae. One species is currently considered valid, E. cornutus, though it has been suggested that the closely related Tetheopsis may also belong to this genus. The first specimen of Eobasileus, consisting of a skull, several vertebrae, and bones associated with the limbs, was collected from Haystack Mountain, from strata belonging to the Washakie Formation. The species became the subject of various letters written by Edward Drinker Cope (its describer) and Othniel Charles Marsh, and their disagreements over its taxonomy and anatomy contributed to the beginning of the Bone Wars.

Eobasileus was the largest dinoceratan, measuring around 1.8 m (5.9 ft) at the shoulder. It looked much like the related genus Uintatherium, though with a far more elongated skull. Like Uintatherium, it had three pairs of blunt horns on its skull, possibly covered with skin like the ossicones of a giraffe. Eobasileus also had a pair of tusks shielded by bony protrusions of the lower jaw, which were likely larger in males than in females. These tusks were longer than those of any other dinoceratan, were recurved towards their tips, and were hollow for about half of their length. Being a dinoceratan, Eobasileus was likely a hindgut fermenter, having a single-chambered stomach wherein plant matter was broken down by microbial activity.

== Taxonomy ==
=== History of research ===
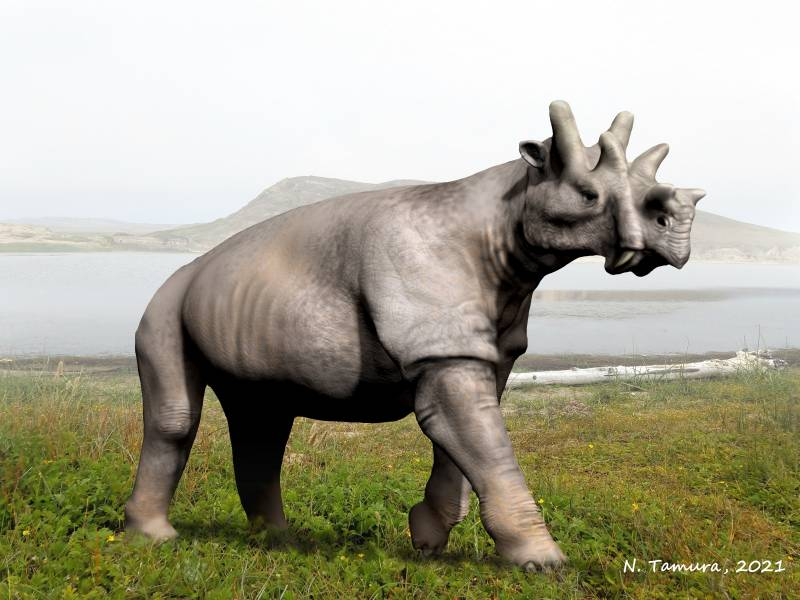
Life restoration of Eobasileus by Nobu Tamura

Eobasileus cornutus was originally described as a species of the obsolete genus Lefalaphodon, L. discornatus (Lefalaphodon is a variant of the more popular obsolete genus Loxolophodon, resulting from a misinterpretation of a telegram from Edward Drinker Cope). Collected from Haystack Mountain in the Washakie Formation was the holotype specimen consisting of a skull, the scapula, some vertebrae, the sacrum, the pelvis and the femur. The species was frequently discussed in letters written by Cope and Othniel Charles Marsh. Eobasileus was moved to different genera and species constantly, with both authors having different ideas on how to interpret the anatomy of the genus. A dispute over Eobasileus specifically and the uintatheres more generally helped to spark the Bone Wars between Cope and Marsh. Cope, Marsh, and Joseph Leidy independently discovered specimens from related species (though Cope and Marsh believed they had each discovered the same species) in the Fort Bridger area, leading to disputes over naming rights for the animals and a series of increasingly hostile letters to various scientific journals. In 1873, Marsh wrote: "Cope has endeavored to secure priority by sharp practice, and failed […] Prof. Cope's errors will continue to invite correction, but these, like his blunders, are hydra-headed, and life is really too short to spend valuable time in such an ungracious task, especially as in the present case Prof. Cope has not even returned thanks for the correction of nearly half a hundred errors[…]" The American Naturalist declined to print this letter as a scientific article, but did publish it as an appendix; Marsh paid for its inclusion.

=== Classification ===
Species assigned to Eobasileus in the past have been assigned to other dinocerates, such as Uintatherium, and the pantodont Coryphodon, as Eobasileus was once grouped within the Amblypoda, an obsolete group containing the dinocerates and the Pantodonta. Currently, only one species of Eobasileus is considered valid; E. cornutus. The species is grouped closely with Tetheopsis (Tetheopsis being considered a synonym of Eobasileus by some authors) and Uintatherium, in the family Uintatheriidae.

The below cladogram is based on that of Schoch & Lucas (1985):

- Dinocerata
  - Prodinoceras
  - - Gobiatherium
    - - Bathyopsis
      - - Uintatherium
        - - Tetheopsis
          - Eobasileus

== Description ==
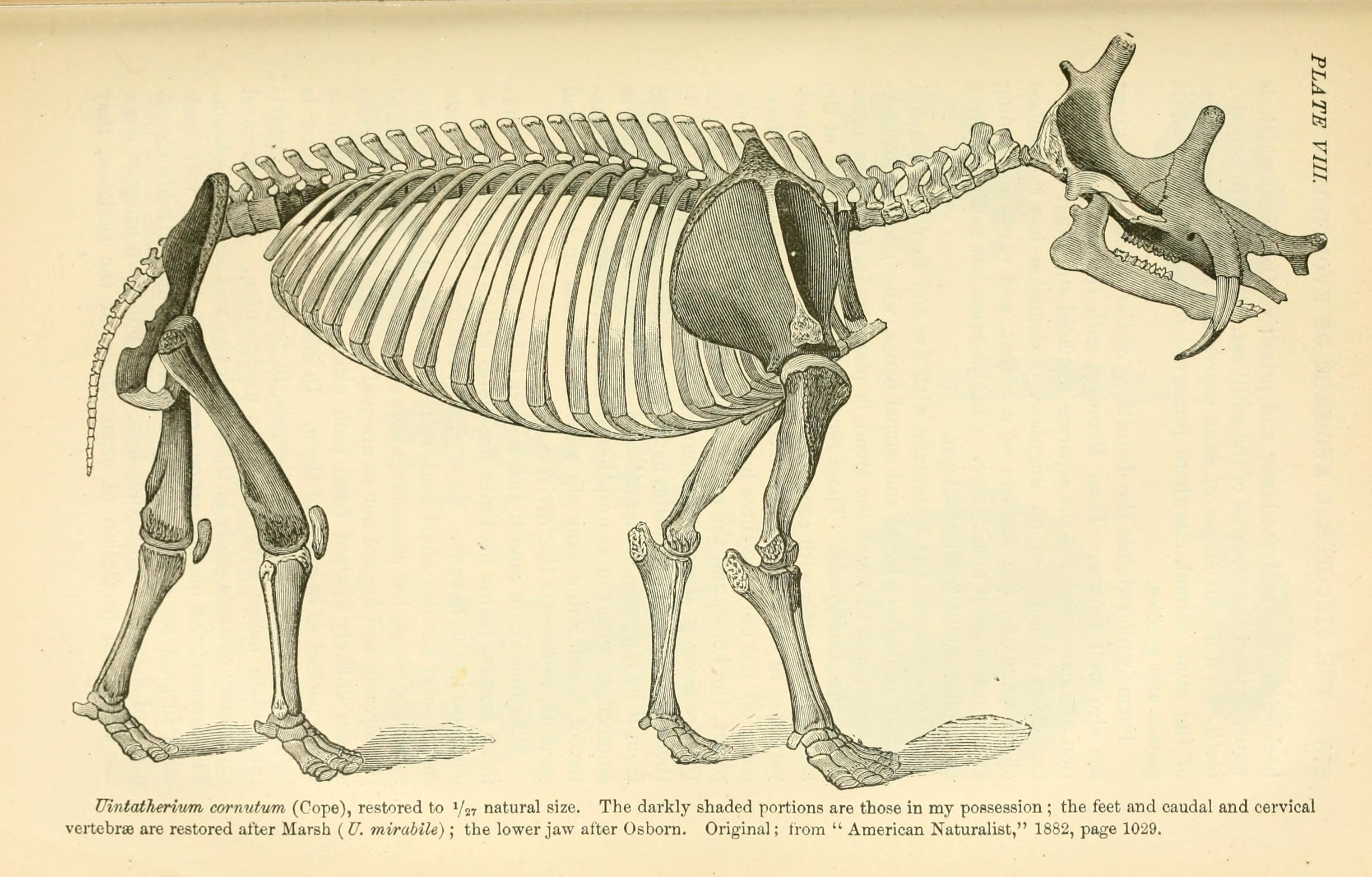
Skeletal reconstruction of Eobasileus

Eobasileus was the largest dinoceratan, standing about 1.8 m (5.9 ft) at the shoulder. Like other uintatheriids, it had three pairs of "horns" on its head: one pair on the nasal bones, one pair on the maxillary bones, and one pair on the parietal bones. Though a covering of keratin (true horn) has been suggested, it is more likely that these structures were analogous to the ossicones of giraffes and were covered in skin. Being a uintatheriid, it is likely that Eobasileus was strongly sexually dimorphic, with males having larger canines, larger flanges on the lower jaws, and an overall larger body size. Based on their body size and environment, William Berryman Scott suggested that uintatheriids such as Eobasileus may have been hairless.

=== Skull and dentition ===
==== Skull ====
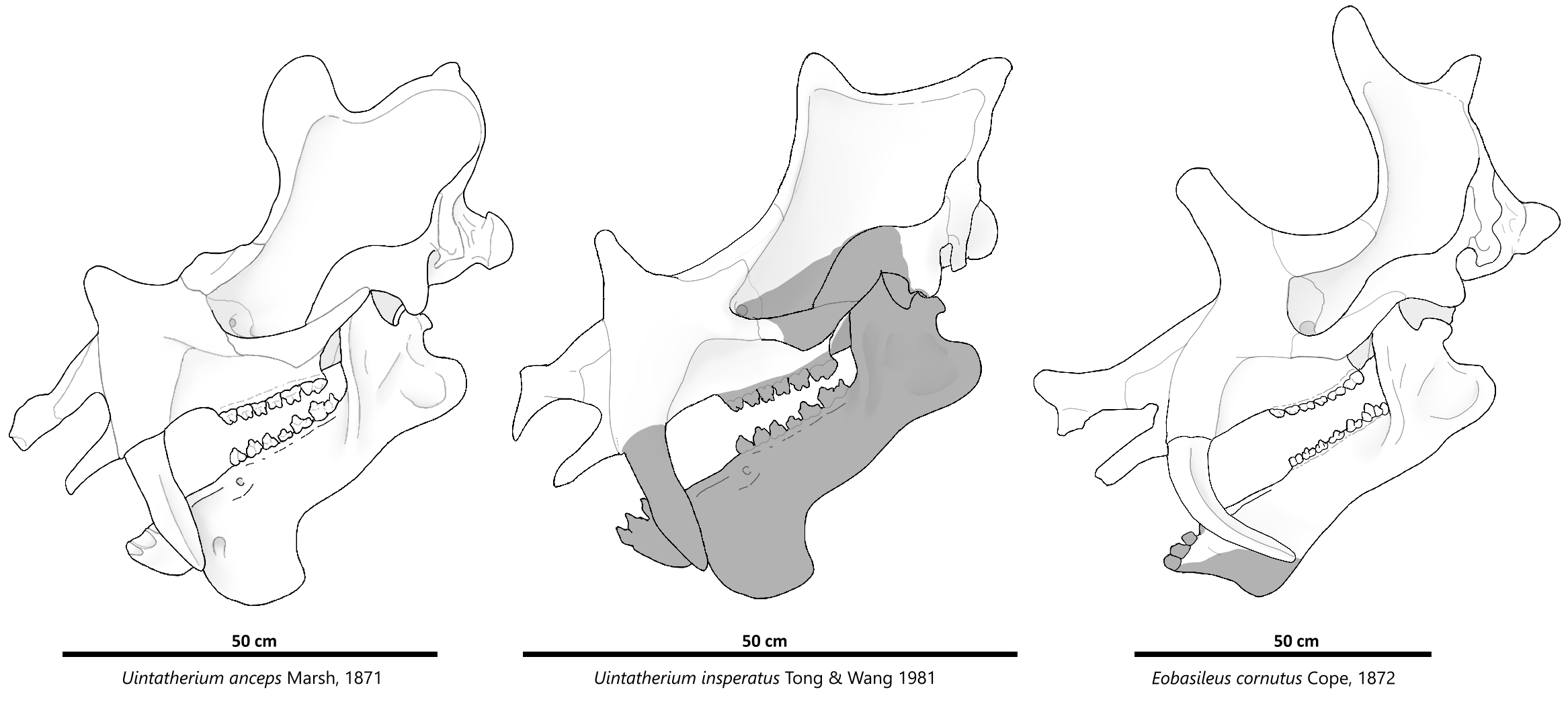
Skull of Eobasileus (right) compared to species of Uintatherium.

Eobasileus had a dolichocephalic (elongated) skull, similar to Uintatherium, with the length being around 85–95 cm (2.79–3.12 ft). The horns on the maxilla are similarly elongated while the nasal horns are flattened and shovel-shaped. The nasals of Eobasileus are extended greatly, hanging over the premaxilla, a trait also seen in rhinoceroses. The unique extension of the nasal bones has led to the suggestion that a Eobasileus had an elephant-like trunk or proboscis, though there is a lack of further evidence for the claim, and other researchers believe such an appendage is unlikely due to the anatomy of the nasal canals. Near to the mastoids the skull widens and is pockmarked by small fossae (holes). On the occiput there is a transverse crest indicated, due to the fact that the occipital rises 10 cm (0.33 ft) above the condyles. The skull anterior to (in front of) the maxillary horns is elongate, with said horns being located near to the premolar teeth. Uniquely, the sinuses of Eobasileus reside in the squamosal region of the skull. The external nares are not separated by a septum. Their lateral (outer) border was marked by a crest on the medial (interior) side of the maxillary and premaxillary bones, which converges and binds a depression in the roof. The zygomatic arches are positioned posteriorly (rearward) and do not enclose the orbits. The vomer does not intersect with the superior crest of the palatine bone. When originally described as Loxolophodon cornutus, there were no known lower jaws of the species, which lead to assumptions that the lower jaw was small due to the anatomy of the skull. Later research, however, disproved this assumption. The horns and other display characteristics of Eobasileus have been suggested to be sexually dimorphic traits.

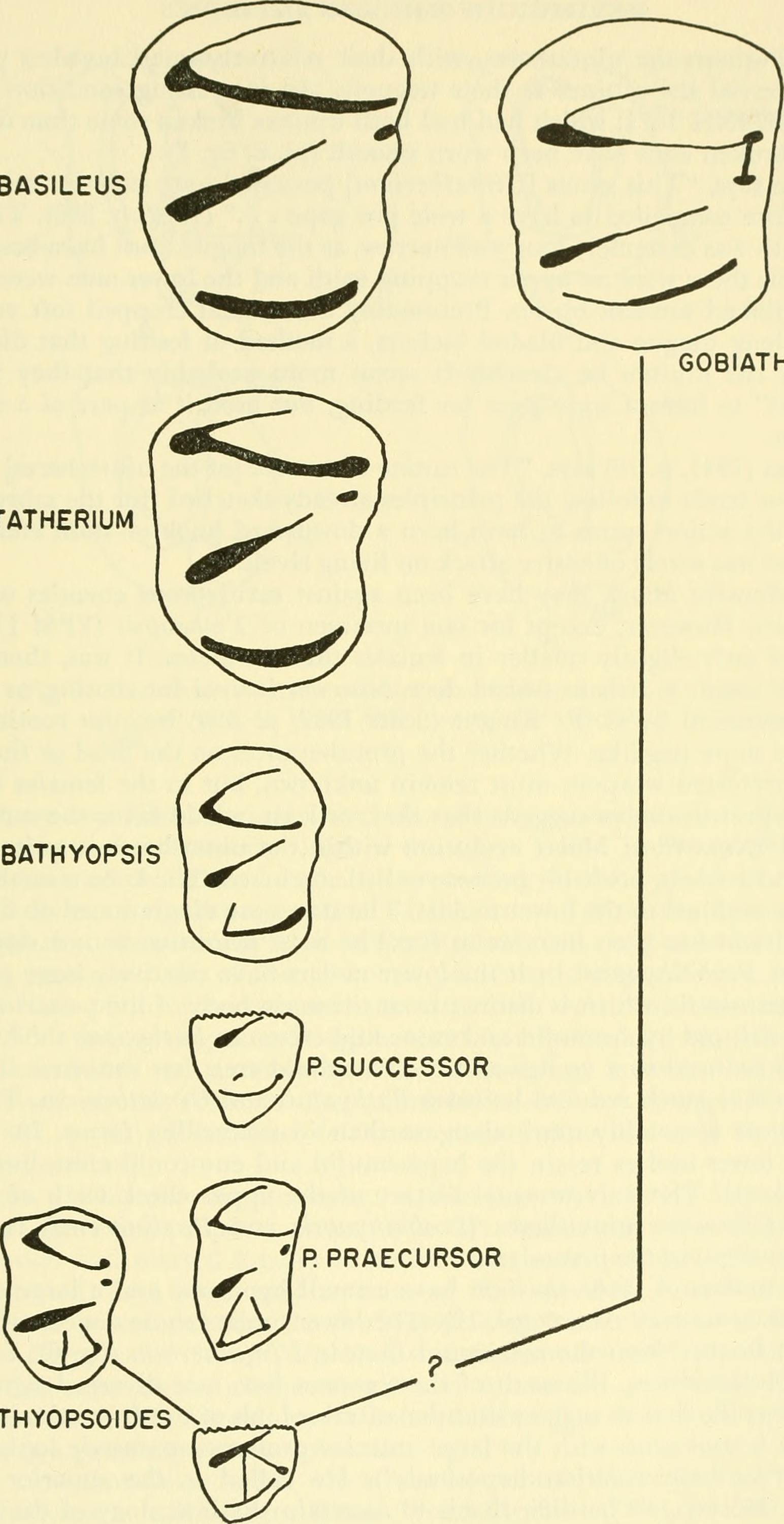
Lower molars of various Dinocerata, with Eobasileus on the top left.

==== Dentition ====
The dental formula of Eobasileus is 0.1.3.33.1.3.3 × 2 = 34. Similar to other dinocerates, it lacks upper incisors. The lower incisors are bilobate, meaning that their crowns are separated into two distinct cusps. The tusks, derived from the upper canine teeth, are significantly longer than the tusks of other dinoceratans, including Uintatherium. They are compressed laterally (from side-to-side) and are separated from the cheek teeth by a prominent gap known as a diastema. For about half of their length, they are hollow. They are recurved posteriorly, and turn laterally towards the tips. Enamel patterns differ depending on the location on the tusk: enamel on the anterior side is rugose, whereas on the posterior side it is smoother. Wear patterns on the teeth of certain specimens causes the grinding surface of the first premolar to assume a "tripodal" shape. The fourth premolar is considerably worn. The molars, in contrast with the canines and in comparison to the overall skull size of Eobasileus, are remarkably small. Their enamel is smooth. Each molar bears a single crescent-shaped crest, which itself bears a single tubercle. The second molar is larger than the third.

=== Appendicular skeleton ===
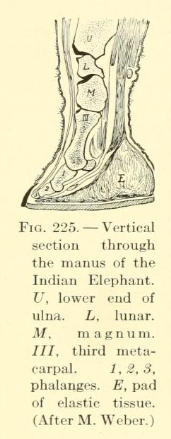
Eobasileus' feet likely had an elastic pad much like those of modern day elephants (pictured)

==== Shoulder girdle and forelimbs ====
The scapula is triangular in shape and has a prominent spine, and the glenoid fossa is flattened longitudinally. On the proximal end of the radius there are two oblique facets, one of which is concave and transverse while the other slants downward. The radius (alongside the other limb bones) are stout and robust, and were hollowed similar to the spongy bone that elephants and titanotheres possess. The radius itself crosses over the ulna diagonally.

==== Pelvis and hind limbs ====
In the pelvis, the iliac plates are ovoid in shape, and the apex curves outwards and downwards. The margins around the acetabulum are thick, while the margins of the rest of the plate are thin. The ischium is compressed and the acetabular notch is nearly symmetrical. Similar to the forelimbs, the hindlimbs are robust and designed to support weight. The femur is enlarged proximally and deep distally, with a contracted shaft and a flattened plane near the trochanter. The trochanter itself is flattened and thick. The head of the femur is globular in shape. The little trochanter is not present on the femur and the trochlear face is neither wide or elevated. Ridges run from above the condyles to the posterior end the shaft. The spine of the tibia is obtuse. The feet are similar in build to proboscideans, though the structure is closer to those of perissodactyls. Much like proboscideans, the phalanges are shortened and hooves are reduced. The arrangement of the bones into a columnar shape suggest there was an elastic pad similar to those of elephants.

== Paleoecology ==
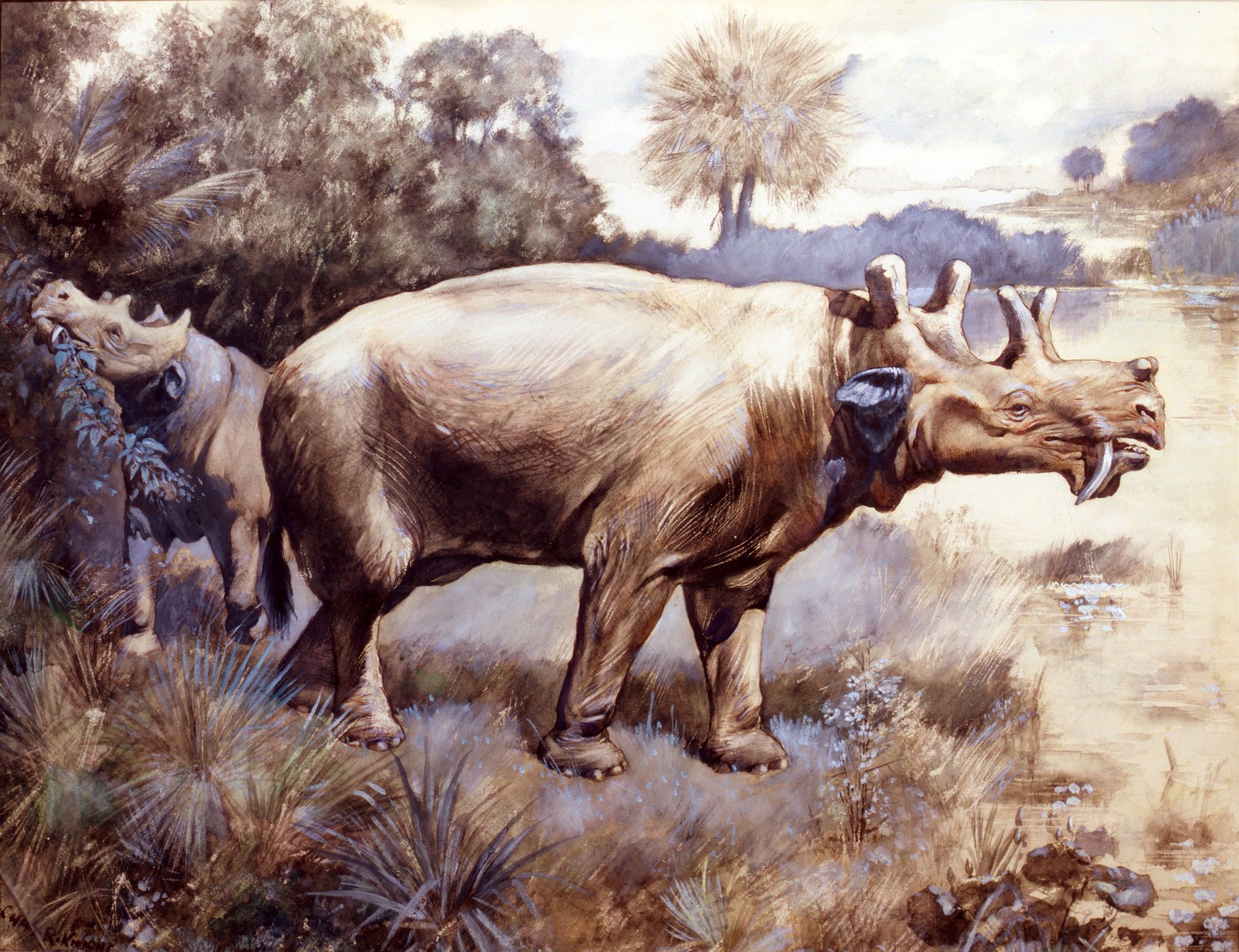
Life restoration of Eobasileus by Charles R. Knight.

Eobasileus was likely an early hind-gut fermenter. It is assumed they were browsers, as suggested by their bilobate incisors. Eobasileus lived in many Bridgerian and Uintan formations, including the Bridger Formation, the Washakie Formation and Moffat County. The areas Eobasileus is known from were, at the time, forested, with the flora likely consisting of many palms and other thermophilic plants. Eocene North America was biodiverse, and Eobasileus is known to have coexisted with many species, including the amynodont Amynodon, brontotheres Dolichorhinus and Sthenodectes; the artiodactyl Achaenodon, the miacid Uintacyon and the oxyaenid Patriofelis, as well as the dinocerate Uintatherium.
