= The Best Time Travel Stories of the 20th Century =

- Cover of first edition
- Editors: Harry Turtledove; Martin H. Greenberg
- Cover artist: David Stevenson
- Language: English
- Genre: Science fiction
- Publisher: Del Rey/Ballantine
- Publication date: 2005
- Publication place: United States
- Media type: Print (paperback)
- Pages: xii, 425
- ISBN: 0-345-46094-4

The Best Time Travel Stories of the 20th Century is an anthology of science fiction time travel short stories edited by Harry Turtledove and Martin H. Greenberg. It was first published in trade paperback by Del Rey/Ballantine in January 2005. The book has been translated into Portuguese.

The book collects eighteen novellas, novelettes and short stories by various science fiction authors, together with a general introduction and prefatory introductions to each piece by Turtledove.

== Contents ==
- "Introduction" (Harry Turtledove)
- "Yesterday Was Monday" (Theodore Sturgeon)
- "Time Locker" (Henry Kuttner)
- "Time's Arrow" (Arthur C. Clarke)
- "I'm Scared" (Jack Finney)
- "A Sound of Thunder" (Ray Bradbury)
- "Death Ship" (Richard Matheson)
- "A Gun for Dinosaur" (L. Sprague de Camp)
- "The Man Who Came Early" (Poul Anderson)
- "Rainbird" (R. A. Lafferty)
- "Leviathan!" (Larry Niven)
- "Anniversary Project" (Joe Haldeman)
- "Timetipping" (Jack Dann)
- "Fire Watch" (Connie Willis)
- "Sailing to Byzantium" (Robert Silverberg)
- "The Pure Product" (John Kessel)
- "Trapalanda" (Charles Sheffield)
- "The Price of Oranges" (Nancy Kress)
- "Another Story or a Fisherman of the Inland Sea" (Ursula K. Le Guin)

== Reception ==
The anthology was reviewed by David Mead in The New York Review of Science Fiction v. 17, no. 7, March 2005.
