= Richard Foss =

American novelist

- Born: October 7, 1956 (age 69); California, U.S.
- Occupations: Author, journalist
- Writing career
- Notable work: Rum: A Global History

Richard Foss is an American journalist, science fiction author, and food historian who has also chaired science fiction conventions and worked as a travel agent, restaurant reviewer, theater director, and instructor in Elizabethan history and culinary history at Osher Institute/UCLA Extension.

== Writing career ==
Foss's science fiction stories have been published in the magazine Analog and the anthologies Alternate Generals II and The Enchanter Completed: A Tribute Anthology for L. Sprague de Camp.

His short story "The History of Chan's Journey to the Celestial Regions", published in the April 2002 Analog, was a nominee for the 2002 Analog Award for Best Short Story.

Foss's restaurant reviews have appeared in The Easy Reader, Manhattan People, Peninsula People, LA CityBeat, and LA ValleyBeat magazine. He is currently on the Board of the Culinary Historians of Southern California.

In 2012 his book Rum: A Global History was released by Reaktion Books in the Edible Series. His book Food in the Air and Space: The Surprising History of Food and Drink in the Skies appeared in December 2014 from Rowman & Littlefield.

== Bibliography ==
=== Fiction ===
- "The History of Chan's Journey to the Celestial Regions" (Analog, Apr. 2002)
- "Probability Zero: Counterspy" (Analog, Jan. 2003)
- "Probability Zero: Just an Average Guy" (Analog, Oct. 2003)
- "Compadres" (with S. M. Stirling) (Alternate Generals II, ed. Harry Turtledove and Martin H. Greenberg, Baen Books, Mar. 2004)
- "Ripples" (The Enchanter Completed: A Tribute Anthology for L. Sprague de Camp, ed. Harry Turtledove, Baen Books, 2005)
- "Probability Zero: Keeping Track" (Analog, Nov. 2005)
- "Incarnation in The Delta" (Abyss and Apex, Jan. 2009)
- "To Leap the Highest Wall" (Analog, Jan./Feb. 2009)
- "Madman's Bargain" (Analog, Mar. 2009)
- "At Last the Sun" (Analog, Jun. 2010)

=== Nonfiction ===
- Rum: A Global History (2012)
- Food in the Air and Space: The Surprising History of Food and Drink in the Skies (2014)

=== Reviews ===
- "Singularity's Ring by Paul Melko" (Analog, Apr. 2009)
- "Blue War by Jeffrey Thomas" (Analog, Apr. 2009)
- "Death's Head: Maximum Offense by David Gunn" (Analog, Apr. 2009)
- "Pirate Sun by Karl Schroeder" (Analog, Apr. 2009)
- "Reading The Wind by Brenda Cooper" (Analog, Apr. 2009)
- "The Science Fiction Hall Of Fame, Volume Two B by Ben Bova" (Analog, Apr. 2009)
- "The Coming Convergence by Stanley Schmidt" (Analog, Apr. 2009)
