= The Legend Book of Science Fiction =

- Cover of first edition
- Author: edited by Gardner Dozois
- Language: English
- Genre: Science fiction
- Publisher: Legend
- Publication date: 1991
- Publication place: United Kingdom
- Media type: Print (hardcover)
- Pages: vii, 672 pp.
- ISBN: 0-7126-4861-5

The Legend Book of Science Fiction is an anthology of science fiction short works edited by Gardner Dozois. It was first published in hardcover and trade paperback by Legend in July 1991. The first American edition was issued in hardcover under the variant title Modern Classics of Science Fiction by St. Martin’s Press in February 1992, with a trade paperback edition following from the same publisher in February 1993; the same firm also produced a hardcover book club edition together with the Science Fiction Book Club in April 1992.

== Summary ==
The book collects twenty-six novellas, novelettes and short stories by various science fiction authors, together with a preface and afterword by the editor.

== Contents ==
- "Preface" (Gardner Dozois)
- "The Country of the Kind" (Damon Knight)
- "Aristotle and the Gun" (L. Sprague de Camp)
- "The Other Celia" (Theodore Sturgeon)
- "Casey Agonistes" (Richard M. McKenna)
- "Mother Hitton's Littul Kittons" (Cordwainer Smith)
- "The Moon Moth" (Jack Vance)
- "The Golden Horn" (Edgar Pangborn)
- "The Lady Margaret" (Keith Roberts)
- "This Moment of the Storm" (Roger Zelazny)
- "Narrow Valley" (R. A. Lafferty)
- "Driftglass" (Samuel R. Delany)
- "The Worm That Flies" (Brian W. Aldiss)
- "The Fifth Head of Cerberus" (Gene Wolfe)
- "Nobody's Home" (Joanna Russ)
- "Her Smoke Rose Up Forever" (James Tiptree, Jr.)
- "The Barrow" (Ursula K. Le Guin)
- "Particle Theory" (Edward Bryant)
- "The Ugly Chickens" (Howard Waldrop)
- "Going Under" (Jack M. Dann)
- "Salvador" (Lucius Shepard)
- "Pretty Boy Crossover" (Pat Cadigan)
- "The Pure Product" (John Kessel)
- "The Winter Market" (William Gibson)
- "Chance" (Connie Willis)
- "The Edge of the World" (Michael Swanwick)
- "Dori Bangs" (Bruce Sterling)
- "Afterword" (Gardner Dozois)
