= The World That Couldn't Be =

- First edition
- Author: Various
- Cover artist: Karel Kezer
- Language: English
- Genre: Science fiction
- Publisher: Doubleday
- Publication date: 1959
- Publication place: United States
- Media type: Print (paperback)
- Pages: 260 p.

The World That Couldn't Be is an anthology of science fiction short-stories selected by Galaxy Science Fiction editor, H. L. Gold.

== Contents ==
- "The World That Couldn't Be" by Clifford D. Simak
- "Brightside Crossing" by Alan E. Nourse
- "Mezzerow Loves Company" by F. L. Wallace
- "Eye for a What?" by Damon Knight
- "A Woman's Place" by Mark Clifton
- "A Gun for Dinosaur" by L. Sprague de Camp
- "One for the Books" by Richard Matheson
- "The Music Master of Babylon" by Edgar Pangborn
- "Once a Greech" by Evelyn E. Smith
