= Time's Arrow (short story) =

1950 short story by Arthur C. Clarke

- Short story by Arthur C. Clarke
- Country: United Kingdom
- Language: English
- Genre: Science-fiction

Publication
- Published in: Science Fantasy
- Publication type: Magazine
- Publication date: 1950

"Time's Arrow" is a science fiction short story by British writer Arthur C. Clarke, first published in 1950 in the first issue of the magazine Science Fantasy. The story revolves about the unintended consequences of using time travel to study dinosaurs.

The story was included in the 2005 anthology The Best Time Travel Stories of the 20th Century. The title matches Sir Arthur Eddington's second law of thermodynamics.

== Plot ==
The story follows a group of scientists, two geologists (Barton and Davis) and a palaeontologist (Fowler), who are excavating dinosaur footprints. They come across two physicists (Barnes and Henderson) who are investigating a strange liquid that exhibits negentropy, which Davis describes as being akin to "Time's Arrow" as "Any clock you care to mention – a pendulum for instance – might just as easily run forward as backward. But entropy is a strictly one-way affair – it's always increasing with the passage of time. Hence the expression, 'Time's Arrow'". This causes the realisation that negentropy could result in a reversal of time.

Fowler is invited to visit Henderson's lab, during which time the two geologists come to believe that the physicist is trying to effectively build a way to view the past firsthand. Henderson confirms their conclusion and asks Fowler to join him during the machine's first test run. The dig continues and the team discovers that the footprints give off the impression that the dinosaur was chasing something. Fowler sets off for the lab via Jeep, shortly after which Davis sees the lab explode and the surrounding area ripple. He returns to alert Barton, who has discovered that the dinosaur tracks are accompanied by Jeep tyre prints, implying that the dinosaur had chased after and subsequently trampled Fowler.

== Development ==
In the preface for Reach for Tomorrow, Clarke notes that "Time's Arrow is an example of how hard it is for the science-fiction writer to keep ahead of fact. The quite – at the time the story was written – imaginary discovery described in the tale now actually exists, and may be seen in the New York Natural History Museum." Eric S. Rabkin likewise commented that "this paleontological possibility.... [slowly uncovering the petrified mud tracks of a huge dinosaur being stalked by some other animal] had not been found in life before Clarke's story, but has been since".

== Release ==
"Time's Arrow" was first published in the inaugural issue of the magazine Science Fantasy, which failed to sell well. The short story was republished in 1956 as part of Clarke's Reach for Tomorrow, which collected several short stories published by the author between 1942 and 1953. It has subsequently been reprinted in collections such as the 1959 omnibus Across the Sea of Stars and the 2005 anthology The Best Time Travel Stories of the 20th Century.

It has been translated into German, Portuguese, Japanese, and French.

== Themes ==
"Time's Arrow" focuses on the theme of time travel, with Clarke using negative entropy as a possible avenue. On the topic of time travel Clarke has stated that the "most convincing argument against time travel is the remarkable scarcity of time travelers", an issue that author Jack McDevitt discusses in his response to "Time's Arrow". He argues that if time travel were possible, it would have been done and "If that happens, history would be littered with tourists."

== Reception ==
The story has been mentioned as an early example of criticism of the time travel concept in fiction. Michael Ashley has lauded the tale as indicative of "the quality that Science Fantasy had from the word 'go'". Rabkin discussed the story in his 1980 text about Clarke, noting that the author "adds his own twists to the classic tale of time travel".
