= A Gun for Dinosaur =

Short story by L. Sprague de Camp

- Short story by L. Sprague de Camp
- Ed Emshwiller's illustration of the story in Galaxy Science Fiction
- Country: United States
- Language: English
- Genre: Science fiction

Publication
- Published in: Galaxy Science Fiction
- Media type: Print (Magazine)
- Publication date: March, 1956

Chronology
- Series: Reginald Rivers
—	The Cayuse

"A Gun for Dinosaur" is a classic time travel science fiction story by American writer L. Sprague de Camp as part of his Rivers of Time series. It tells the story of four men who travel into the past to hunt dinosaurs.

It was first published in the magazine Galaxy Science Fiction for March, 1956, and first appeared in book form in the anthology The World That Couldn't Be and 8 Other SF Novelets (Doubleday, 1959). The story went on to appear in numerous anthologies and collections.

== Plot summary ==
The story takes the form of a first-person narrative by the protagonist, time-traveling hunter and safari guide Reginald Rivers, told to Mr. Seligman, a prospective client of his time safari business. Seligman's contributions to the conversation are omitted and must be inferred from those of Rivers. Rivers informs the client that he is not big enough to hunt the dinosaurs of the Cretaceous period and illustrates his point with an extended anecdote from a previous expedition, which forms the main portion of the tale.

On the occasion in question, Rivers and his partner, Chandra Aiyar “The Raja”, conduct two other clients to the past. One of them, Courtney James (based on Jack Parsons), is a vain, arrogant and spoiled playboy; the other, August Holtzinger, is a small, timid man recently come into wealth (time safaris are not cheap). Before the journey, they test-fire some guns on the firing range to settle on weapons for each of them. Holtzinger's small size makes him incapable of effectively handling the Continental .600 elephant gun which Rivers recommends (the recoil knocks him over) and, against his better judgment, Rivers lets Holtzinger travel on the safari with a Winchester 70, a lighter-caliber weapon chambered for a .375 magnum cartridge.

James proves unmanageable by shooting at every creature in sight, each time emptying his gun in spite of orders to the contrary, and spoiling Holtzinger's shots. Ultimately James's foolishness gets him in real danger when he inadvertently empties his gun over a slumbering Tyrannosaur, which consequently wakes and goes for him and the Raja. When he can't reload his gun in time, James panics and tries to flee but runs into the Raja and knocks them both down. Holtzinger tries to save them by shooting the dinosaur, but his gun is not powerful enough to kill it, and his act only attracts it toward the shooter. Despite the best efforts of Rivers and the Raja to save Holtzinger, the Tyrannosaur catches him in its jaws and makes off with his body. After a fruitless track for the Tyrannosaur so that Holtzinger's body could be recovered, a furious quarrel with James ensues. He and the guides each blame the other for their companion's death, which leads to a fist fight between James and Rivers in which James is defeated. James tries to shoot both Rivers and the Raja, but is knocked out by a rock thrown by the Raja. James is then physically restrained until the time chamber returns, and during the trip back to the present swears revenge.

Later, after the expedition has returned to the present, James convinces Professor Prochaska, the inventor of the time chamber, to send him back to the Cretaceous again but at a moment just prior to the emergence of the safari's earlier visit. His plan is to shoot Rivers and the Raja just when they originally came out of the time machine; however, since that obviously had not happened, the space-time continuum avoids the paradox by spontaneously snapping James back to the present, with the forces involved instantly killing him.

Concluding his tale, Rivers makes his point with Seligman by emphasizing Holtzinger's fate.

== Revision and continuations ==
Many years after writing the story, de Camp penned eight more tales of its protagonist, time-traveling hunter Reginald Rivers; all nine stories were then collected as Rivers of Time (1993). A tenth tale of Rivers, "Gun, Not for Dinosaur", authored by Chris Bunch, later appeared in Harry Turtledove's 2005 tribute anthology honoring L. Sprague de Camp, The Enchanter Completed.

De Camp revised the story slightly for its inclusion in Rivers of Time to update obsolete paleontological terms and dated references. In one instance the result was unfortunate; in the original version of the story, Rivers estimates Seligman's weight in both pounds and stone; in the revised version both measures are rendered as kilograms, resulting in Rivers appearing to make the same calculation twice.

Following its initial publication, "A Gun for Dinosaur" was re-printed in numerous other anthologies, including The Time Curve (1968), 3000 Years of Fantasy and Science Fiction (1972), Dawn of Time (1979), Science Fiction A to Z (1982), Grand Masters' Choice (1989), Dinosaurs! (1990), Dinosaurs (1996), Timescapes: Stories of Time Travel (1997), The SFWA Grand Masters, Volume 1 (1999), The World Turned Upside Down (2005), The Best Time Travel Stories of the 20th Century (2005), and Sense of Wonder: A Century of Science Fiction (2011), as well as such collections of de Camp's work as A Gun for Dinosaur and Other Imaginative Tales (1963), The Best of L. Sprague de Camp (1978), Rivers of Time (1993), and Years in the Making: the Time-Travel Stories of L. Sprague de Camp (2005). It has been translated into French (twice), German (three times), Italian (twice), Czech, Russian, Dutch, Spanish, Japanese, and Portuguese. It has also been adapted into radio and comic book form, including an adaptation by Roy Thomas in Vol. 1 Issue #2 (July 1973) of the Marvel Comics Group title Worlds Unknown.

== Reception ==
The story was a nominee for the 1956 Hugo Award for Best Novelette.

P. Schuyler Miller singles out the story as "one of the classic time-travel stories invading the years of the dinosaurs."

S. E. Cotts calls it "one of my favorites," noting that "[i]ts subject, about a safari into the past, has been successfully tackled by other writers, but this version has solid merit."

Sam Moskowitz, who felt de Camp's "plots less incisive" during this period, cited this story as an "outstanding exception" discussing "with an air of quiet authority the problem of what type of gun and what methodology were best suited to shooting dinosaurs."

Don D'Ammassa calls it "an undeniably classic story of the dangers of time travel."

Harry Turtledove deems the piece a "classic, ... at the same time a fine character study, a meditation on time-travel paradoxes (here treated as something the continuum seeks to avoid rather than a likely result of voyaging into the past), and a splendid re-creation of a vanished world. De Camp makes the reader feel the heat and humidity of the world to which Reginald Rivers and his band of hunters are transported--and feel the bites from insects with mouthparts evolved to pierce dinosaur hide. He does a masterful job of discussing the difficulties inherent in hunting extinct behemoths with weapons small enough for one man to handle. When troubles arise, they do so as a natural consequence of the characters' personalities, and are more moving and convincing because of that." He feels the story "has also aged very well, despite the vast increase in paleontological knowledge in the past half-century."

== Influence and literary responses ==
- Mark B. Goodwin claims de Camp's story "popularized the idea that pachycephalosaurs used their domed skulls as a kind of battering ram," a notion first suggested as "a wild idea" by vertebrate paleontologist Edwin H. Colbert in 1955. (The pachycephalosaur episode appears on pages 14–15 of the story as published in Rivers of Time.)
- David Drake in his 1981 story "Time Safari", uses a very similar set of characters and events. In "Time Safari", the guide character dismisses as a misconception a significant point (to both stories) about the need for a sufficiently large gun to kill a dinosaur, thus contradicting the earlier story.
- Author Leonard Richardson mentions his disappointment that this story "is not about a dinosaur who buys a gun" as one of his influences in writing his own 2009 short story, "Let Us Now Praise Awesome Dinosaurs."

== See also ==
- A Sound of Thunder

Preceded by none	Reginald Rivers series "A Gun for Dinosaur"	Succeeded by "The Cayuse"
