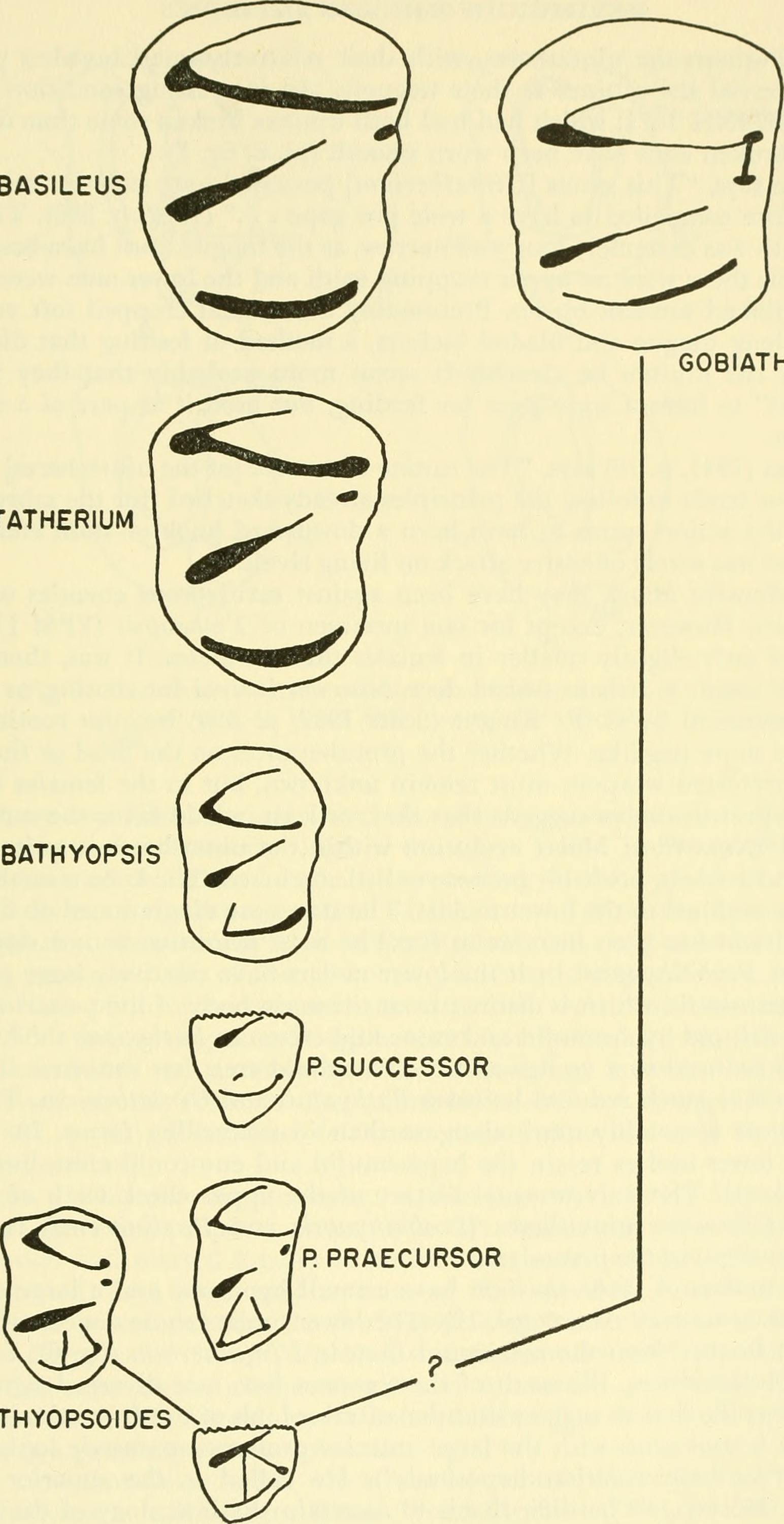
- Evolution of the teeth of the Dinocerata, with "Probathyopsis successor" (above, now considered a synonym of P. praecursor) and Probathyopsis praecursor (below)

Scientific classification
- Kingdom: Animalia
- Phylum: Chordata
- Class: Mammalia
- Order: †Dinocerata
- Family: †Prodinoceratidae
- Genus: †Probathyopsis; Simpson, 1929

Species
- P. harrisorum (Patterson, 1939); P. lysitensis (Kelley and Wood, 1954); P. praecursor (Simpson, 1929); P. sinyuensis (Chow and Tung, 1962)

Synonyms
- P. newbilli; P. successor; Prouintatherium

= Probathyopsis =

Probathyopsis Temporal range: Late Paleocene–Early Eocene

Extinct genus of dinocerate

Probathyopsis, from Ancient Greek πρό (pró), meaning "before", βαθύς (bathús), meaning "thick", and ὄψις (ópsis), meaning "face", is an extinct genus of dinocerate mammal from Paleocene North America.

== Description ==
Probathyopsis is incredibly basal compared to the later dinocerates in terms of anatomical characteristics. The genus lacks the characteristic skull knobs, unlike derived dinocerates. The flange on the mandible is also less developed as in later members of the clade, like Uintatherium. The lower molars are also longer and narrower than in later members of the group. The genus was sexually dimorphic, with males being larger and having larger mandibular flanges.

== Classification ==
The classification history of Probathyopsis is convoluted. It has been suggested at times to be a synonym of Prodinoceras, though there is debate to this as many authors still recognize the genus as valid. Currently the genus is believed to be among the most basal of all dinocerates and is grouped closely with Prodinoceras, in the family Prodinoceratidae.
