= Lest Darkness Fall and To Bring the Light =

Lest Darkness Fall [and] To Bring the Light
- Cover of first edition
- Author: L. Sprague de Camp, David Drake
- Cover artist: Ken Tunnell
- Language: English
- Genre: Science fiction
- Publisher: Baen Books
- Publication date: 1996
- Publication place: United States
- Media type: Print (paperback)
- Pages: xi, 336
- ISBN: 0-671-87736-4

Lest Darkness Fall [and] To Bring the Light is an anthology of time travel alternate history stories by American writers L. Sprague de Camp and David Drake. It was first published in paperback by Baen Books in August 1996. The book has been translated into Italian.

== Summary ==
The book collects de Camp's classic timeslip novel Lest Darkness Fall, in which a modern man is transported to the past and uses his knowledge of history to change events, together with a new novella on a similar theme by Drake, in which a woman from a past era finds herself in an even earlier one and uses her knowledge of legend to ensure the events that gave rise to her own world actually take place. The book includes an introduction by Harry Turtledove.

== Contents ==
- Lest Darkness Fall by L. Sprague de Camp. A shorter version first appeared in the magazine Unknown v. 11, no. 4, December 1939; expanded to novel length, it was first published in book form by Henry Holt and Company in 1941. There have been numerous editions since. Martin Padway, an American archeologist visiting Rome in 1938, is struck by lightning at the Pantheon and finds himself transported back in time to the Rome of 535 AD. In that period the Western Roman Empire has long since fallen, and for nearly sixty years Italy has been ruled by barbarians, currently the Ostrogoths. However, the Eastern Roman or Byzantine Empire is poised to invade and reconquer the peninsula in a ruinous war Padway knows from history will devastate the country and mark the onset of the Dark Ages. To ensure his own survival and prevent the impending collapse of civilization, he sets out to introduce technical innovations from his own time. As Italy is invaded, he also becomes involved in political and military affairs, becoming the power behind the Ostrogothic throne and defeating the Byzantines. By the end of the novel, Padway has stabilized the Italo-Gothic kingdom and consolidated his reforms. Due to his actions, Europe will not experience the Dark Ages, and darkness will not fall.
- "To Bring the Light" by David Drake, published here for the first time. This story features Flavia Herosilla, a well-educated woman living in Imperial Rome, watching a procession headed by the Emperor Philip the Arab - when a sudden thunderstorm breaks out. Like Padway, she is sent back in time by a lightning strike, in her case to the era of Rome's beginnings around 751 BC. It takes her some time to understand that the rolling green hills she sees are the Seven Hills of Rome, which she had known were completely built up and covered with palaces and tenements. Among the rude shepherds living in a tiny village on top of Palatine Hill are people whom she always considered as myth and whose historical veracity she had doubted. But they are all too real, one of them trying to rape her and needing to be fought off by tricks she had learned from a Bactrian wrestler. Finding her feet in this archaic setting, Flavia can use her sophisticated urban knowledge to manipulate and overawe the villagers, and is soon in a position to organize and implement a bloody regime change in Alba Longa - a minor provincial town by Flavia's Imperial Roman standards, but the crucial hub of local power in the here and now. Unlike Padway, who tried to change history, Flavia simply seeks to make sure that the Founding of Rome would take place on schedule and that the legends that she knows would come true. But there is one detail she does want to change. The legends tell that on the day of Rome's founding, Romulus killed his brother Remus - and while in the process of making sure that Rome would be founded, Flavia Herosilla had fallen in love with Remus ...

== Relation to other works ==
The book was an instance of a publishing practice in the 1990s of reprinting classic short works of science fiction together with sequels or thematically related stories by other hands. Other de Camp works that received this treatment were "The Wheels of If," paired with a sequel by Harry Turtledove and published as The Pugnacious Peacemaker/The Wheels of If (Tor Books, April 1990), and The Undesired Princess, paired with a thematically related story by David Drake and published as The Undesired Princess & The Enchanted Bunny (Baen Books, May 1990).
