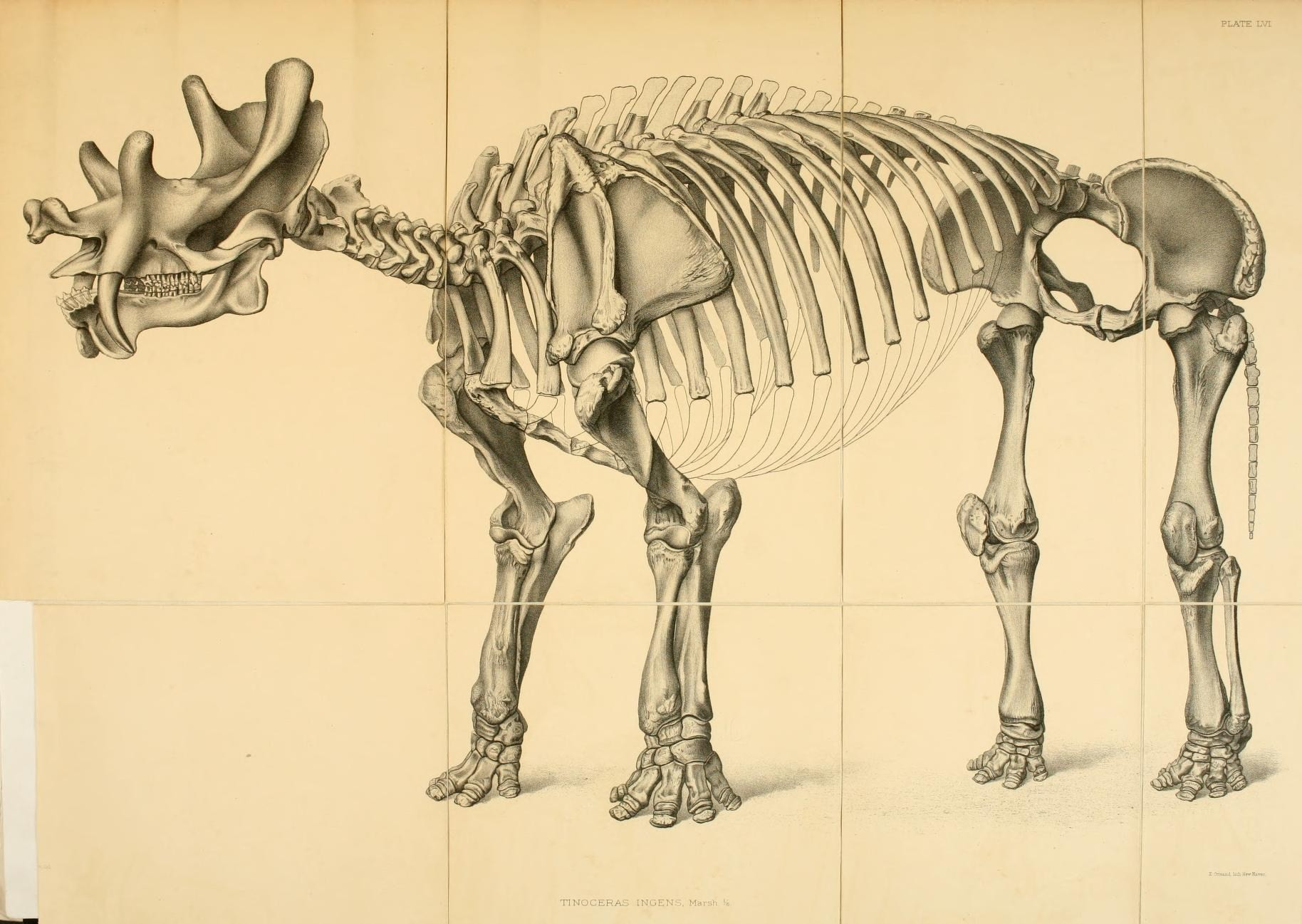
- Skeleton of Eobasileus
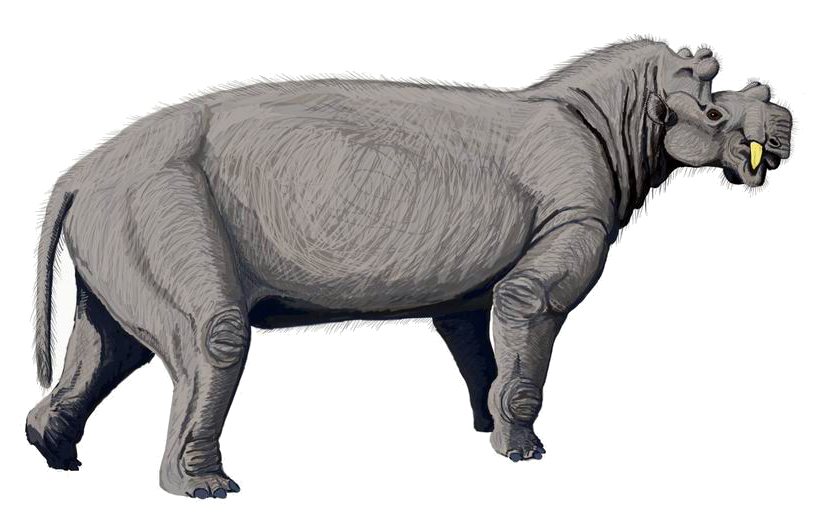
- Life restoration of Uintatherium.

Scientific classification
- Kingdom: Animalia
- Phylum: Chordata
- Class: Mammalia
- Clade: †Uintatheriamorpha
- Order: †Dinocerata; Marsh, 1872

Families and genera
- See text

= Dinocerata =

Dinocerata Temporal range: Late Paleocene–Middle Eocene

Extinct order of mammals

Dinocerata, from Ancient Greek δεινός (deinós), "terrible", and κέρας (kéras), "horn", or Uintatheria, is an extinct order of large herbivorous hoofed mammals with horns and protuberant canine teeth, known from the Paleocene and Eocene of Asia and North America. With body masses ranging up to 4,500 kilograms (9,900 lb) they represent some of the earliest known large mammals.

== Description ==
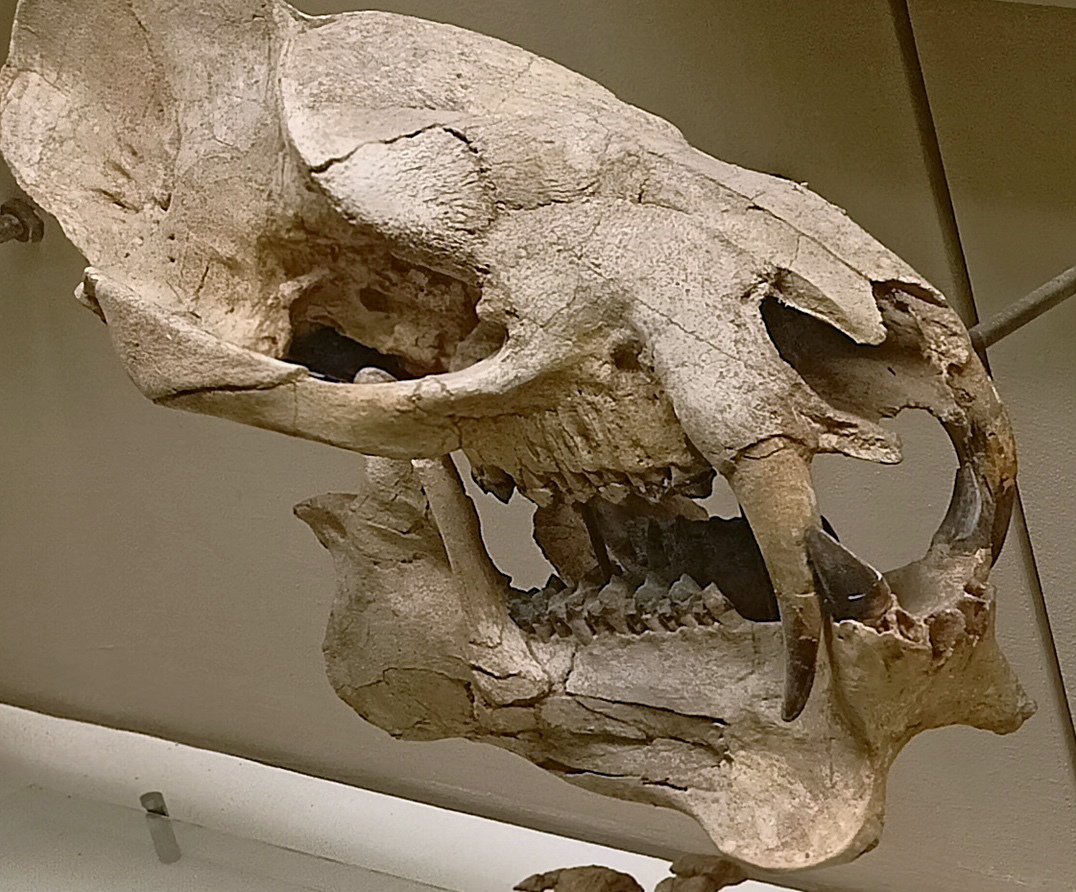
Skull of Prodinoceras, one of the earliest dinoceratan genera

Uintatheriids are suggested to have been browsers. Over the course of their evolution, dinoceratans underwent a great increase in body size, from a weight of 175 kilograms (386 lb) in the earliest species to a weight of up to 4,500 kilograms (9,900 lb) in the largest species, co-inciding with the development of fully graviportal limbs with a digitigrade posture. Later members of the order are noted for their distinctive pairs of horns that develop from the maxillary and parietal bones of the skull, along with the development of elongated upper canines. The upper incisors were also lost, and the bilophodont nature of the molar teeth was enhanced.

== Evolution ==
The oldest and most primitive members of the group, such as Prodinoceras, appeared virtually simultaneously during the late Paleocene in North America and Asia, indicating connection between the two landmasses (probably via Beringia), with uintatheres continuing to exchange between the landmasses during the Eocene, as suggested by the presence of Uintatherium in both North America and China. Uintatheres became extinct towards the end of the Middle Eocene, for unknown reasons.

== Classification ==
The affinities of the group within Placentalia have historically been contentious. A 2015 phylogenetic study recovered Dinocerata as part of Laurasiatheria, closely related to ungulates and "condylarths", with Dinocerata placed as the sister group to the South American native ungulate group Xenungulata. A close relationship with Xenungulata was first proposed in 1985, with the proposed clade containing both groups named Uintatheriamorpha, though other authors have suggested that these similarities are likely to be due to convergence.

== Taxonomy and phylogeny ==
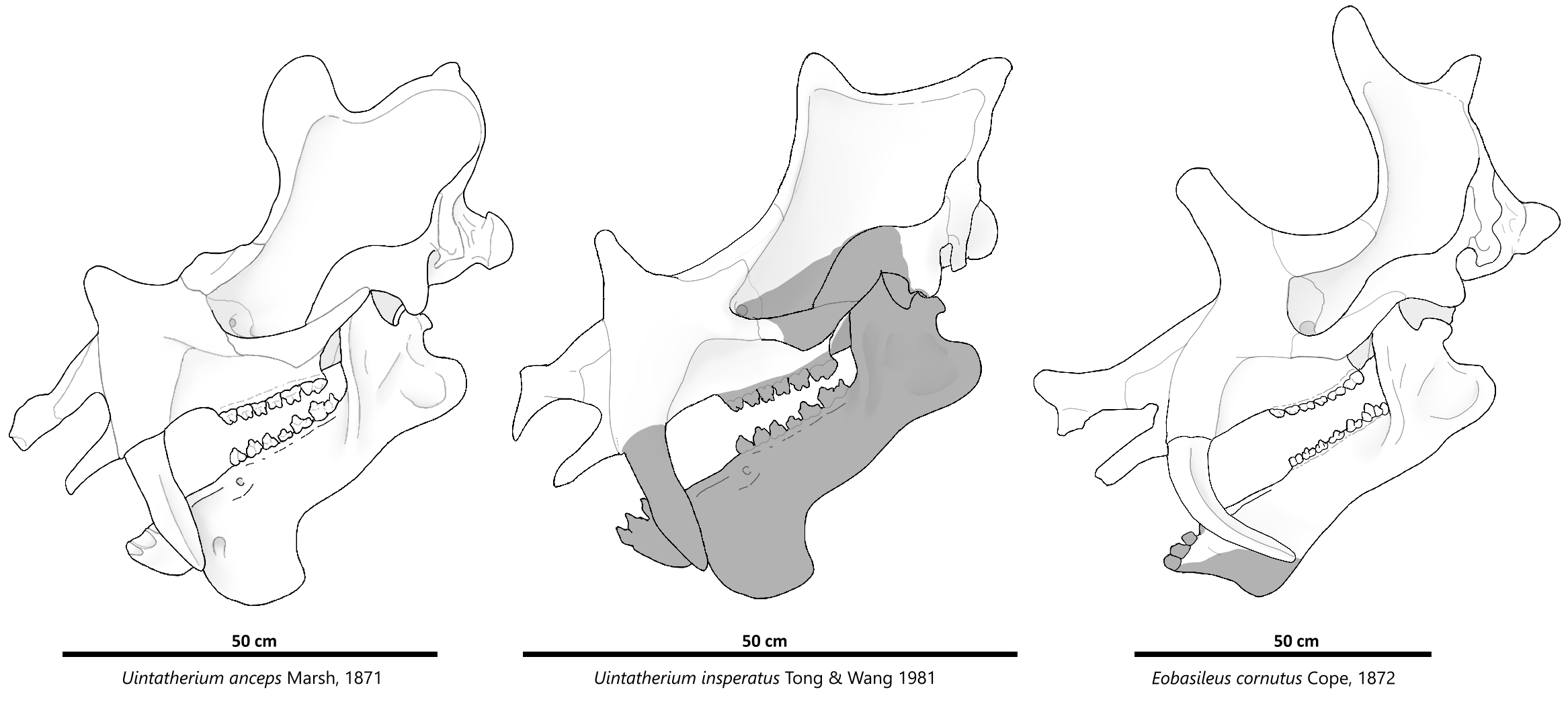
Diagram comparing the skulls of Eobasileus cornutus, Uintatherium anceps, and Uintatherium insperatus

Dinocerata is generally divided into two families, "Prodinoceratidae", containing the most primitive genus Prodinoceras, with some authors also choosing to include the genus Probathyopsis, and Uintatheriidae, containing all other genera. Members of Prodinoceratidae are likely ancestral to Uintatheriidae. The Asian uintatheriid genus Gobiatherium is often placed into its own separate subfamily Gobiatheriinae, with all other uintatheriids belonging to the subfamily Uintatheriinae.

- Order Dinocerata
  - Family Prodinoceratidae
    - Prodinoceras
    - ?Probathyopsis
  - Family Uintatheriidae
    - Gobiatherium
    - Probathyopsis
    - Bathyopsis
    - Uintatherium
    - Eobasileus
    - Tetheopsis
