= Lest Darkness Fall =

1941 novel by L. Sprague de Camp

- Dust cover of first edition
- Author: L. Sprague de Camp
- Cover artist: S. M. Adler and H. Lubalin
- Language: English
- Genre: Alternate history
- Publisher: Henry Holt and Company
- Publication date: 1941
- Publication place: United States
- Media type: Print (hardback)
- Pages: 379

Lest Darkness Fall is a 1939 alternate history science fiction novel by the American author L. Sprague de Camp. Lest Darkness Fall is similar in concept to Mark Twain's A Connecticut Yankee in King Arthur's Court, but the treatment is very different.

== Plot ==
American classical archaeologist Martin Padway is visiting the Pantheon in Rome in 1938. A thunderstorm arrives, lightning cracks, and he finds himself transported to Rome in 535 AD. The Italian Peninsula is under the rule of the Kingdom of the Ostrogoths. The novel depicts their rule as a relatively benevolent despotism, allowing freedom of religion and maintaining the urban Roman society they had conquered, though slavery is common and torture the normal method of interrogation.

Padway initially wonders whether he is dreaming or delusional, but he quickly accepts his fate. As an archaeologist, he has enough understanding of various devices used before his time, but after the 6th century, to be able to reproduce them by the means available. He can speak both modern Italian and Classical Latin, and quickly learns enough Vulgar Latin to communicate effectively. Most crucially, Padway has read with great attention the book of the historian Procopius, who described the Gothic War (535–554) at whose outset Padway finds himself. He recalls the book in great detail, down to details of the time and route of the various armies' moves and their tactical and strategic considerations, as well as the convoluted and violent power struggles of the various contenders for the Gothic Kingship. Thus Padway, in effect, knows the direct, immediate future of the country where he lives and of some individual people whom he meets (at least, until he acts in a way that changes that future). In addition to this specialized and uniquely useful knowledge of the current war, Padway has taken a general interest in military history, which he is eventually able to put to very practical purposes.

Padway's first idea is to make a copper still and sell brandy for a living. He persuades a banker, Thomasus the Syrian, to lend him seed money to start his endeavor. He teaches his and Thomasus's clerks Arabic numerals and double entry bookkeeping. He eventually develops a printing press, issues a newspaper, and builds a crude semaphore telegraph system utilizing small telescopes. However, he fails to produce a mechanical clock, and temporarily halts his experiments attempting to reinvent gunpowder and cannons. He becomes increasingly involved in the politics of the state as Italy is invaded by the Byzantines and also threatened from the north.

Padway rescues the recently deposed king Thiudahad and becomes his quaestor. He uses the king's support to gather forces to defeat the formidable Byzantine general Belisarius. He manages to surprise Belisarius with tactics never used in the ancient world. Then, deceiving the Dalmatian army, Padway reinstates the senile Thiudahad and imprisons King Wittigis as a hostage. In 537, when Wittigis is killed and Thiudahad descends into madness, Padway has a protégé of his, Urias, married to Mathaswentha and crowned king of the Ostrogoths. He tricks Justinian I into releasing Belisarius from his oath of allegiance and quickly enlists the military genius to command an army against the Franks.

The landing of a Byzantine army at Vibo, led by Bloody John, and a rebellion, led by Thiudahad's son, threaten the Ostrogothic kingdom and its army is destroyed at Crathis Valley. Padway assembles a new force, spreads an "emancipation proclamation" to the Italian serfs and recalls Belisarius after his defeat of the Franks. The armies clash near Calatia and then Benevento. Despite the lack of discipline of his Gothic forces, some simple tactical tricks and the nick-of-time arrival of Belisarius secure Padway's victory.

At the end of the novel, Padway has stabilized the Italo-Gothic kingdom, introduced a constitution, arranged the end of serfdom, liberated the Burgundians, and is having boats built for an Atlantic expedition to acquire tobacco. The king of the Visigoths has appointed Urias as his heir, reunifying the Goths. Ultimately, due to Padway's actions, Europe will not experience what Enlightenment thinkers retrospectively named the Dark Ages: "darkness will not fall".

== Principal characters ==
- Martin Padway (self-Latinized as Martinus Paduei): Protagonist. Transported from 1938 Rome to its 535 equivalent.
- Nevitta, Nevitta Gummund's son: Gothic farmer, Padway's best friend in ancient Rome.
- Thomasus the Syrian: Banker and confidant of Padway. Often invokes God's name, especially while bickering.
- Fritharik, Staifan's son: Deposed Vandal noble, who becomes Padway's bodyguard and right-hand man. Often laments the loss of his beautiful Carthage estate and remarks that they will eventually all end up in unmarked graves.
- Julia from Apulia: A servant hired by Padway who has a one-night stand with him.
- Dorothea: Daughter of Cornelius Anicius and love interest for Padway.
- Leo Vekkos: Greek physician called in by Nevitta, against Padway's protests, to treat his cold.
- Count Honorius: City prefect/governor.
- Liuderis: Commander of the Goths' garrison in Rome.
- Thiudahad: King of the Ostrogoths and Italians. He is deposed and replaced by Wittigis, but is brought back under Padway's influence.
- Thiudegiskel: The pompous son of Thiudahad. He is usually found surrounded by his posse of friends, using his position to put anyone who wrongs him in trouble.
- Urias: Nephew of Wittigis and an ally of Padway's. Becomes king with Padway's help after Thiudahad is no longer fit to rule.
- Mathaswentha: Daughter of Amalswentha and the other love interest for Padway. Their brief romance is cut short when she decides, to Padway's horror, to have any competition killed. Padway sets her up with Urias, whom she marries.
- Belisarius: General of the Eastern Roman Empire. Eventually persuaded by Padway to join the Gothic army.

== Publication history ==
A novella version was first published in Unknown #10, December 1939. The complete novel was published by Henry Holt and Company on 24 February 1941 and reprinted by both Galaxy Publishing and Prime Press in 1949. The first British edition was published in hardcover by Heinemann in 1955. The first paperback edition was published by Pyramid Books in February 1963 and reprinted in August 1969. A later paperback edition was issued by Ballantine Books in August 1974 and reprinted in 1975, 1979 and 1983; the Ballantine edition was also issued in hardcover by the Science Fiction Book Club in April 1979 and reprinted in 1996. The importance of the work was recognized by its inclusion in The Easton Press's series The Masterpieces of Science Fiction in 1989. The book has also been collected with David Drake's novella "To Bring the Light" in Lest Darkness Fall and To Bring the Light (Baen Books, 1996), with other works by de Camp in Years in the Making: the Time-Travel Stories of L. Sprague de Camp (NESFA Press, 2005), and with works by other authors in Lest Darkness Fall and Related Stories (Phoenix Pick, 2011). An E-book edition was published by Gollancz's SF Gateway imprint on September 29, 2011, as part of a general release of de Camp's works in electronic form. Galaxy's Edge magazine reprinted Lest Darkness Fall over four issues starting in August 2014, repeating a typographical error that appears in Lest Darkness Fall and Related Stories ("have" for "lave" in Padway's seduction scene).

== Sequels by other hands ==
Several short story sequels to Lest Darkness Fall, written by other authors, have appeared over the years. "The Apotheosis of Martin Padway", written by S. M. Stirling, appeared in Harry Turtledove's 2005 tribute anthology honoring L. Sprague de Camp, The Enchanter Completed, and the 2011 Arc Manor anthology Lest Darkness Fall and Related Stories. It offers glimpses of what might have become of the reality Padway altered, both during his old age and a few hundred years later.

"Temporal Discontinuity" by David Weber appeared in the second edition of the Arc Manor anthology, retitled Lest Darkness Fall and Timeless Tales Written in Tribute (2021); it was newly commissioned for the edition. It is another direct sequel, though incompatible with Stirling's "The Apotheosis of Martin Padway." Like "Apotheosis," it also involves a future time-traveler investigating Padway's temporal disruptions, only she thinks he's a criminal from her own time who set out to change the timeline on purpose - a crime punishable by death. When agent Yawen Clasen-Hamatti confronts Padway in person, she discovers her mistake and has a moral dilemma on her hands.

"The Fake Pandemic" by Harry Turtledove, was also commissioned for the second edition of the Arc Manor anthology. It is also a direct sequel to de Camp's novel, compatible with Stirling's but not Weber's. In it, Padway recruits the Byzantine jurist Tribonian in an effort to prevent the Plague of Justinian. The story follows Tribonian as he proceeds to secure the emperor Justinian I's permission and support to do just that, and follows him on his successful if thankless mission (Justinian may be supportive, but he is far from grateful).

== Related works ==
Subsequent to Lest Darkness Fall, de Camp wrote two subsequent works with similar themes: "The Wheels of If" (1940) and "Aristotle and the Gun" (1958).

Direct responses to Lest Darkness Fall include the stories "The Deadly Mission of Phineas Snodgrass" (1962) by Frederik Pohl, and "The Man Who Came Early" (1956) by Poul Anderson. In the Pohl tale, a man travels back to 1 BC and teaches modern medicine, causing a population explosion. It ends with the fantastically overpopulated alternate timeline sending someone back to assassinate the title character, allowing darkness to fall for thankful billions. It was reprinted in the anthologies The Enchanter Completed (2005) and Lest Darkness Fall and Related Stories (2011). The Anderson piece is a tale of an American airman sent by a storm (like Padway) to Saga Age Iceland; in this instance, the outcome proves tragic due to cultural misunderstandings and a poor fit between the protagonist's attempted innovations and local needs.

Another story inspired by Lest Darkness Fall is "To Bring The Light", by David Drake, published together with the original in the 1996 Baen double Lest Darkness Fall and To Bring The Light and the 2011 anthology Lest Darkness Fall and Related Stories. This story features Flavia Herosilla, a well-educated woman living in ancient Rome at its height. Like Padway, she is sent back in time by a lightning strike, in her case to the era of Rome's beginnings around 751 BC. Unlike Padway, who tries to change history, Flavia tries to recreate the founding of Rome based on the legends that she knows. But there is one detail she does want to change. The legends tell that on the day of Rome's founding, Romulus killed his brother Remus - and while in the process of making sure that Rome will be founded, Flavia Herosilla had fallen in love with Remus.

Several editions of Lest Darkness Fall, including the one printed with "To Bring the Light", repeat an error in the sequence where Padway and Julia from Apulia are setting up their one night stand: in the original text a somewhat inebriated Padway says Julia's dirty feet form a barrier and "I must lave the pedal extremities...". Apparently some editor failed to recognize "lave" as a synonym for "wash" and turned the word into "have".

== Reception ==
Jo Walton wrote, "In 1939, L. Sprague de Camp came up with one of the wonderful ideas of science fiction, the man taken out of his time to a time of lower technology... As soon as Padway's there, he puts his head down and starts to concentrate on what makes these books such fun—improvising technology from what he knows and can find around him. Padway starts with distilling and double-entry bookkeeping and makes his way up to newspapers and heliographs... The more you know history, the more you can see how clever the book is... De Camp was a historian of technology. His The Ancient Engineers (1963) is a... fascinating non-fiction book." Stating that it "is an excellent introduction to Rome at the time of the Gothic invasion", Carl Sagan in 1978 listed Lest Darkness Fall as an example of how science fiction "can convey bits and pieces, hints and phrases, of knowledge unknown or inaccessible to the reader".

Boucher and McComas praised the novel as "a witty version of the Connecticut Yankee theme, distinguished by its lore of Gothic Rome." Algis Budrys termed it "marvelous," rating it as "Maybe the best [book] DeCamp ever wrote." P. Schuyler Miller wrote that "Next to Wells's "Time Machine", this could be the best time-travel novel ever written."

== General and cited sources ==
- Bleiler, Everett (1948). The Checklist of Fantastic Literature. Chicago: Shasta Publishers. p. 95.
- Laughlin, Charlotte; Daniel J. H. Levack (1983). De Camp: An L. Sprague de Camp Bibliography. San Francisco: Underwood/Miller. pp. 72–75.
