= The Enchanter Completed: A Tribute Anthology for L. Sprague de Camp =

2005 anthology of short stories edited by Harry Turtledove

- Cover of The Enchanter Completed
- Author: edited by Harry Turtledove
- Cover artist: Tom Kidd
- Language: English
- Subject: Science fiction, Fantasy
- Publisher: Baen Books
- Publication date: 2005
- Publication place: United States
- Media type: Print (Paperback)
- Pages: 400 pp
- ISBN: 0-7434-9904-2
- OCLC: 57573785

The Enchanter Completed: A Tribute Anthology for L. Sprague de Camp is a 2005 gedenkschrift honoring American science fiction and fantasy author L. Sprague de Camp, in the form of an anthology of short stories edited by Harry Turtledove. It was first published in paperback by Baen Books. All but one of the pieces are original to the anthology; the remaining one, Frederik Pohl's "The Deadly Mission of P. Snodgrass", was originally published in 1964 in the magazine Galaxy.

The works in the book are all representative of the sort of stories de Camp commonly wrote, inspired by his writings, or sequels to stories by him. A few even include him as a character, either explicitly or slightly disguised. An introduction by Turtledove and an afterword by Robert Silverberg provide factual information regarding de Camp and the impact he had on their lives and work.

== Contents ==
- "Sprague: An Introduction" by Harry Turtledove
- "A Land of Romance" by David Drake
- "The Ensorcelled ATM" (a Gavagan's Bar and W. Wilson Newbury tale) by Michael F. Flynn
- "Penthesilia" by Judith Tarr
- "Ripples" by Richard Foss
- "Gun, Not for Dinosaur" (a Reginald Rivers tale) by Chris Bunch
- "Father Figures" by Susan Shwartz
- "Tom O'Bedlam and the Mystery of Love" by Darrell Schweitzer
- "One for the Record" by Esther M. Friesner
- "The Haunted Bicuspid" by Harry Turtledove
- "Return to Xanadu" (a sequel to a Harold Shea tale) by Lawrence Watt-Evans
- "The Apotheosis of Martin Padway" (a sequel to Lest Darkness Fall) by S. M. Stirling
- "The Deadly Mission of P. Snodgrass" by Frederik Pohl
- "The Garden Gnome Freedom Front" by Laura Frankos
- "The Newcomers" by Poul Anderson
- "Sprague: An Afterword" by Robert Silverberg
