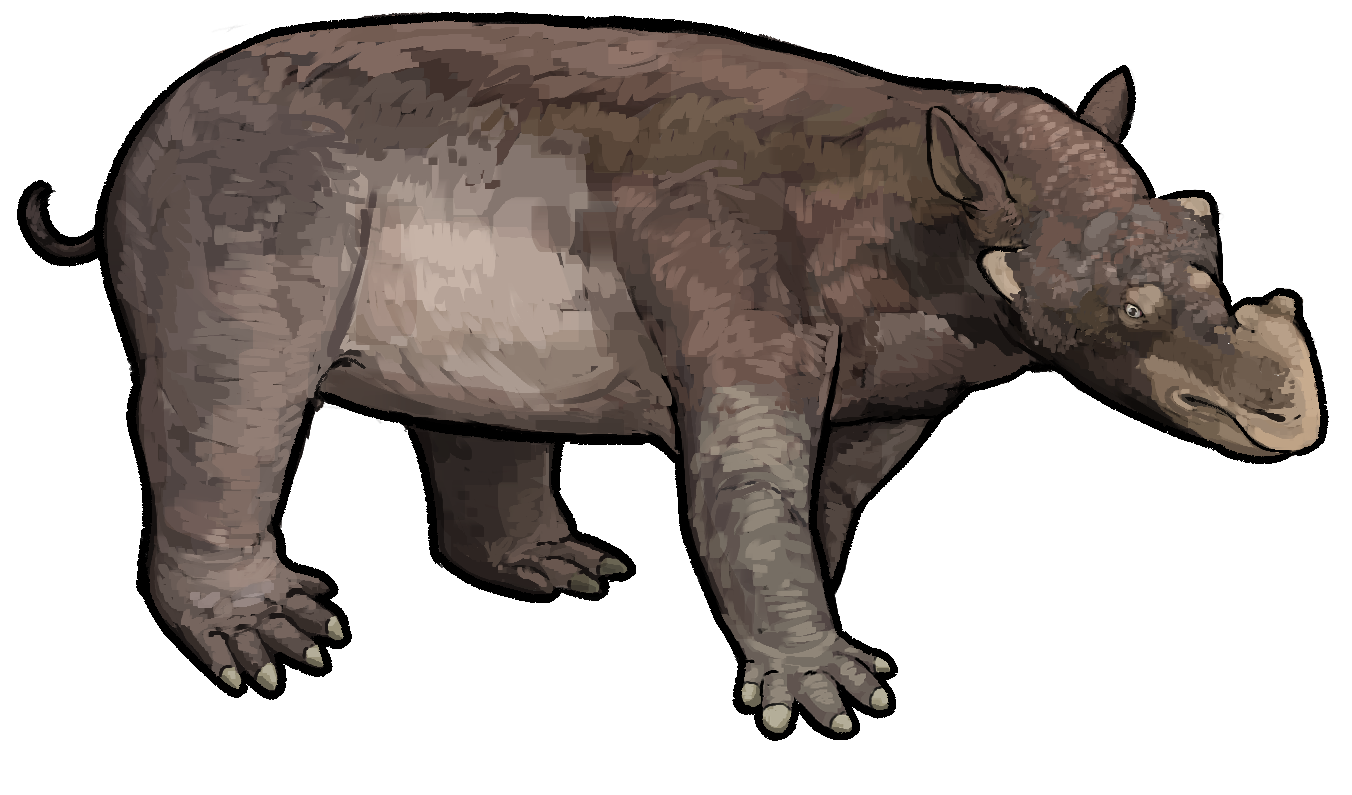
- Life restoration

Scientific classification
- Kingdom: Animalia
- Phylum: Chordata
- Class: Mammalia
- Order: †Dinocerata
- Family: †Uintatheriidae
- Subfamily: †Gobiatheriinae; Flerov, 1952
- Genus: †Gobiatherium; Osborn & Granger, 1932

Species
- G. mirificum Granger and Osborn, 1932; G. minutum M.a. Cheng, 1990

= Gobiatherium =

Gobiatherium Temporal range: Middle Eocene 48.6–37.2 Ma

Extinct genus of mammals

Gobiatherium (from Gobi Desert, and Ancient Greek θηρίον (thēríon), meaning "beast") was one of the last uintatheriids, from the Mid Eocene of Mongolia.

== Description ==
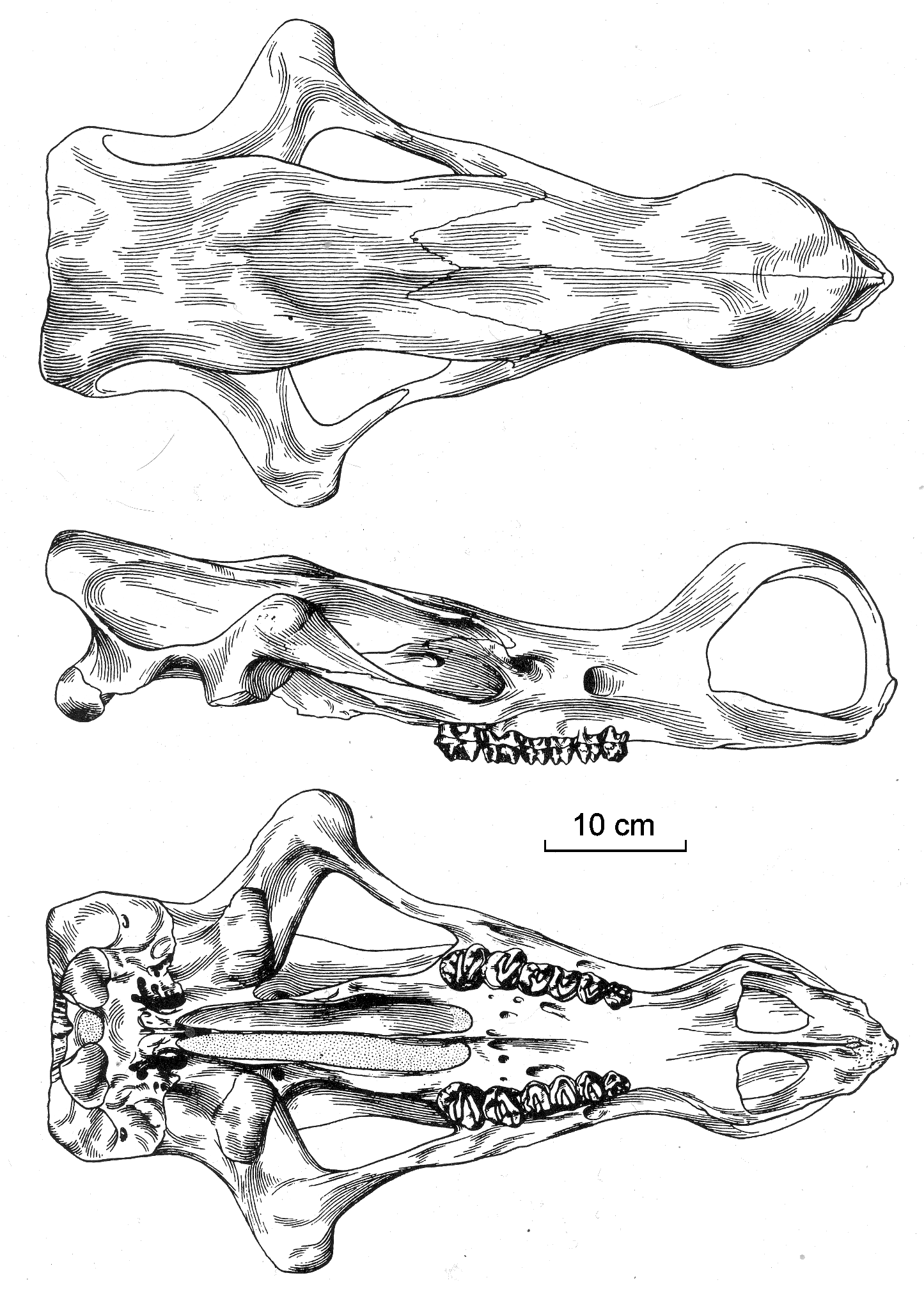
Skull of Gobiatherium

Unlike its North American cousins, Uintatherium or Eobasileus, Gobiatherium lacked knob-like horns, or even fang-like tusks. Instead, it had enlarged cheekbones and an almost spherical snout. The dental formula of the genus is 0.0.3.33.1.3.3. The lower incisors were bilobed, and the genus lacks upper canines all together. The lower canines are reduced, and the lower jaw is shallow.

== Classification ==
Because of the noticeable lack of many diagnostic uintathere features, the genus is placed within its own subfamily, Gobiatheriinae, within Uintatheriidae. Historically, Gobiatherium was grouped within its own family, Gobiatheriidae, alongside Uintatheriidae and Prodinoceratiidae, though this is not supported.
