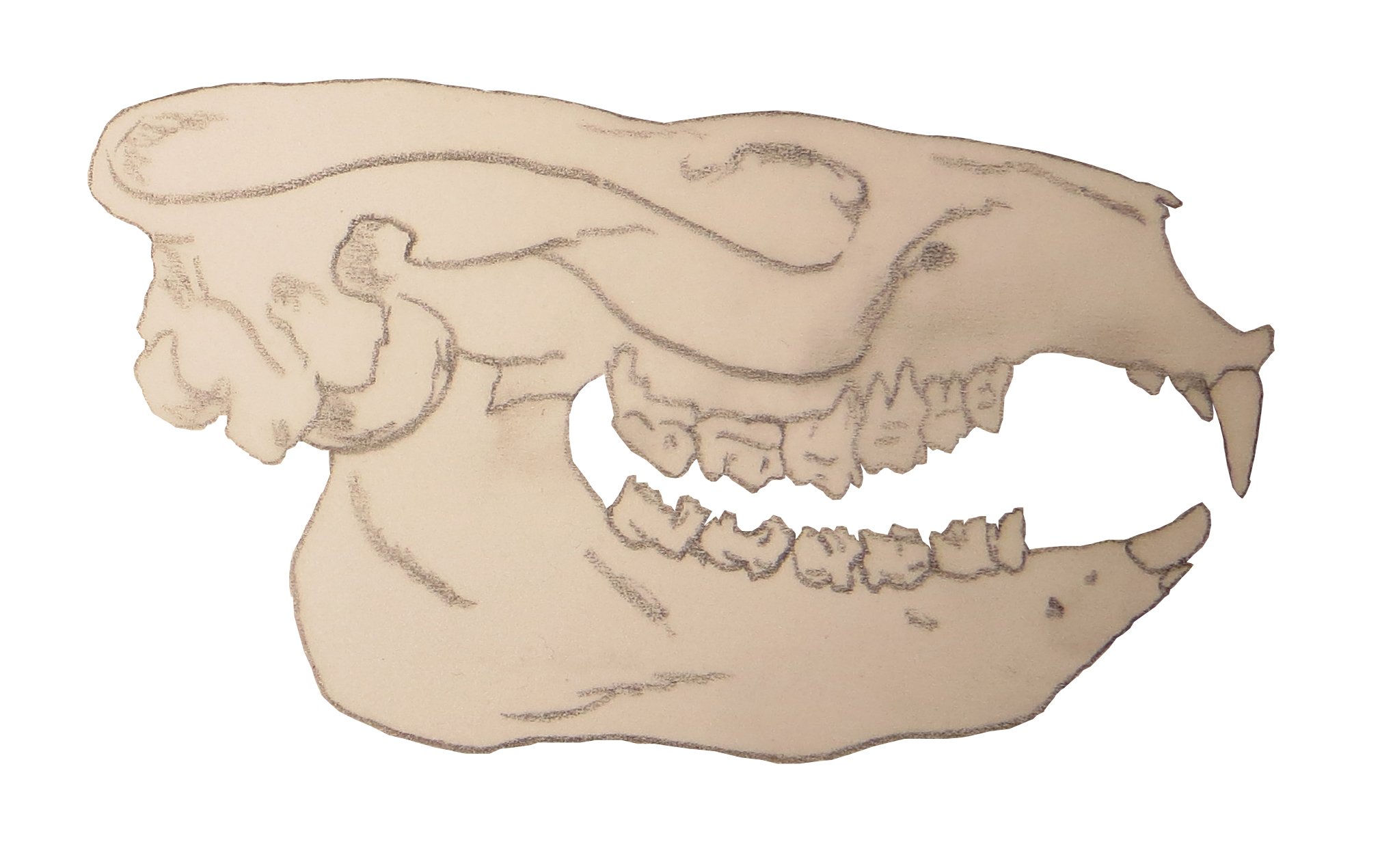
- Skull of Notostylops

Scientific classification
- Domain: Eukaryota
- Kingdom: Animalia
- Phylum: Chordata
- Class: Mammalia
- Order: †Notoungulata
- Suborder: †Notioprogonia; Simpson 1934

Families
- †Henricosborniidae; †Notostylopidae

= Notioprogonia =

Notioprogonia Temporal range: Late Paleocene-Early Oligocene (Itaboraian-Tinguirirican) ~58.7–28.4 Ma

Extinct suborder of mammals

Notioprogonia is a suborder of the extinct mammalian order Notoungulata and includes two families, Henricosborniidae and Notostylopidae.

Notioprogonia includes the most primitive notoungulates and Cifelli 1993 has argued that Notioprogonia is paraphyletic because it would include the ancestors of the remaining suborders. Notioprogonia is not a natural group but an assemblage of primitive notoungulates; the two families assigned here simply do not clearly belong to any other clades.

== Description ==
Henricosborniids such as Henricosbornia and Othnielmarshia from the late Paleocene (Itaboraian-Casamayoran SALMA) have generalized, low-crowned teeth with the dental formula 3.1.4.33.1.4.3 and are dentally the most primitive notoungulates, most likely located near the origin of all other notoungulates. Simpsonotus, also from the late Paleocene and geologically the oldest notoungulate, provides us with the only known Henricoborniid skull. It lacks an epitympanic sinus and a tympanic crest, auditory specializations that are considered synapomorphic of notoungulates, which suggests that these features evolved within notoungulates. Simpsonotus' anterior dentition, on the other hand, is slightly odd and apparently derived, which suggest that it represents a divergent lineage.

Notostylopids such as the Casamayoran Notostylops and Boreastylops are slightly more derived than henricoborniids. Their dentition make them superficially similar to early primate-like (non-South American) mammals such as Plesiadapis.

Arctostylopidae, a family known from the northern hemisphere, was previously included in Notioprogonia, but their resemblance to notoungulates is now believed to be convergent. Simpson 1934 included Arctostylopidae when he first described Notioprogonia, and explained:

The Suborder Notioprogonia is, therefore, named and defined to solve the present problem. The creation of this fourth suborder makes the differentiation of the other three much easier and renders it possible to make an arrangement of all the adequately known notoungulates which is relatively free of anomalies and confusion. The suborder is largely, but not exclusively, defined on primitive and negative characters. This does not necessarily make the group less distinctive, even verbally, since it includes no strongly aberrant forms which need to be considered as exceptional within it and since the other groups include no adequately known forms which are readily confused with notioprogonians.

== Classification ==
- †Family Henricosborniidae
  - †Henricosbornia
  - †Othnielmarshia
  - †Peripantostylops
  - †Simpsonotus
- †Family Notostylopidae
  - †Anastylops
  - †Boreastylops
  - †Edvardotrouessartia
  - †Homalostylops
  - †Notostylops
  - †Otrhonia
  - †Parastylops
- Incertae sedis
  - †Satshatemnus
  - †Seudenius
