= Geology of Uruguay =

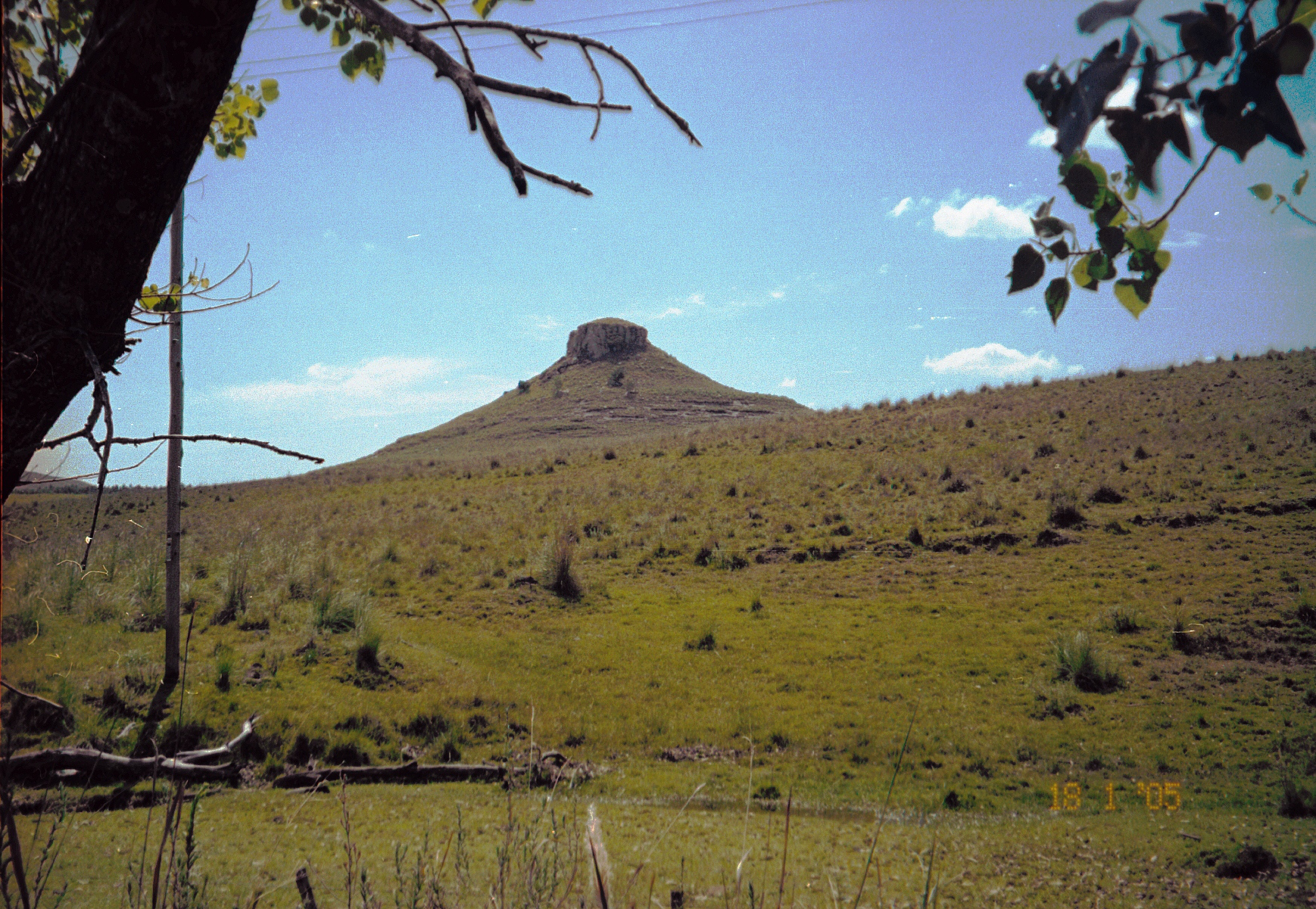
Cerro Batoví is an erosional remnant made up of flood basalt overlying sedimentary rocks.

Approximate location of Mesoproterozoic (older than 1.3 Ga) cratons in South America and Africa

The geology of Uruguay combines areas of Precambrian-aged shield units with a region of volcanic rock erupted during the Cretaceous and copious sedimentary facies the oldest of which date from the Devonian. Big events that have shaped the geology of Uruguay include the Transamazonian orogeny (2000 million years ago (mya)), the breakup of Rodinia (700–500 mya) and the opening of the South Atlantic (~145 mya).

== Shield region ==
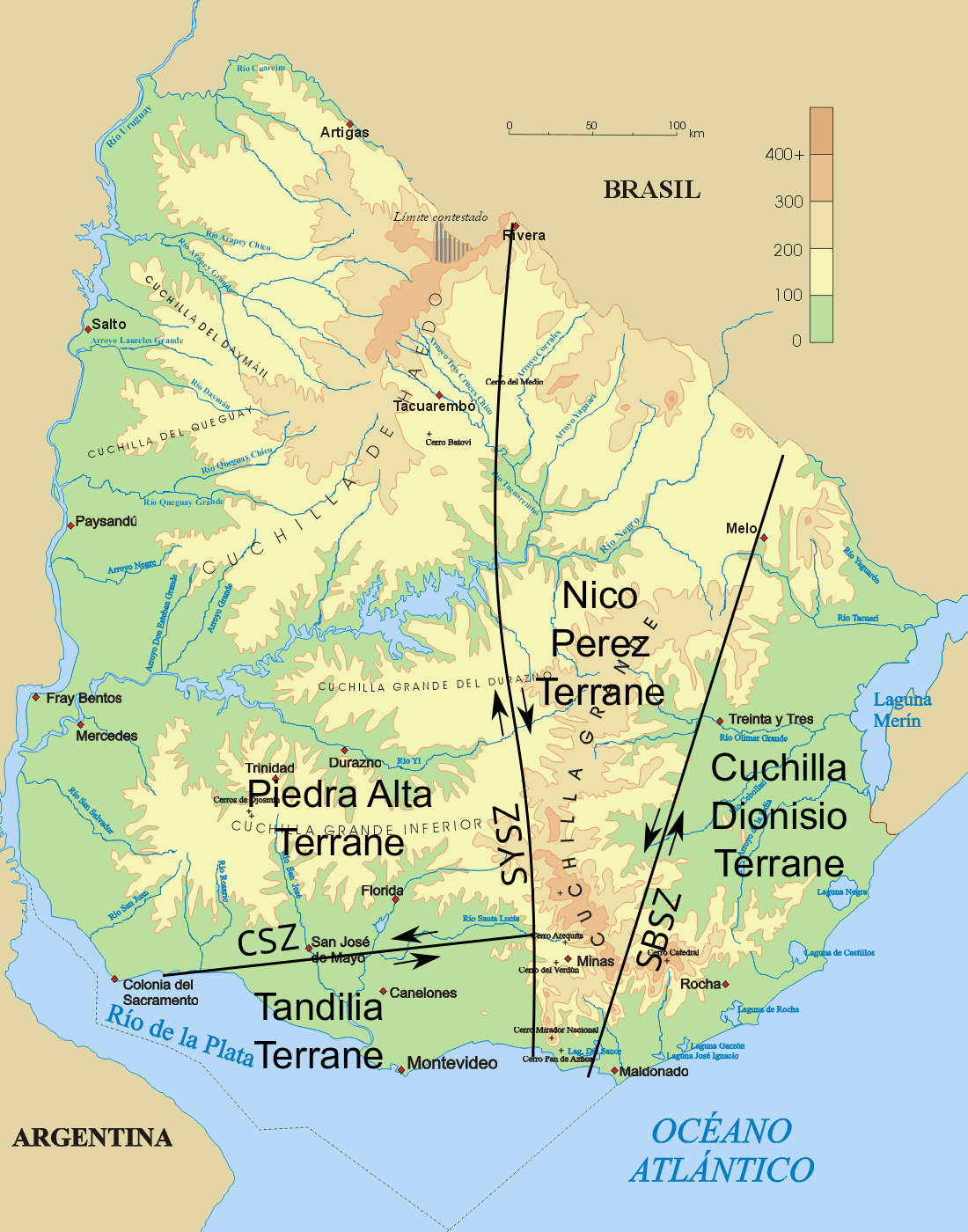
Shear zones and terranes in Uruguay after Gaucher et al., 2008. Sarandí del Yí Shear Zone is marked as "SYSZ". To the east Sierra Ballena Shear Zone is marked as "SBSZ".

The Precambrian shield in Uruguay includes part of Río de la Plata craton, an extensive area of stable crystalline basement rock underlying Uruguay and large areas of eastern Argentina and southern Brazil. The shield in Uruguay goes under the name of Rio Grande do Sul—Uruguay Shield and includes parts of Southern Brazil. Though the Río de la Plata Craton underlies practically all of Uruguay, it only shows up in the south and east of the country since in other parts of the country, it is covered by younger volcanic rocks or sediments. The shield was formed during two orogenic events; one 2000 million years ago (mya) for the western part and another 700–500 mya for the eastern part. The later orogenic event is the result of the accretion of blocks and terranes in the aftermath of the breakup of Rodinia when São Francisco and Río de la Plata cratons formed one plate in the west of the Adamastor Ocean. The eastern part of the Uruguayan shield region is crossed by two major shear zones both running roughly in north-south direction the dextral Sarandí del Yí-Piriápolis Shear Zone and the sinistral Sierra Ballena Shear Zone. West of Sarandí del Yí Shear Zone the Río de la Plata Craton is intruded by the Late Paleoproterozoic Florida dyke swarm.

The area between Sarandí del Yí and Sierra Ballena shear zones –that is the Nico Pérez Terrane– is made of metamorphic and granitoid rocks which are the oldest rocks in Uruguay. It has not been established to which degree this terrane belongs to or has affinity with the Río de la Plata Craton. The rocks of Nico Pérez Terrane formed originally in the Archean eon and Paleoproterozoic era and much were later affected by the Brasiliano orogeny in Neoproterozoic era.

== Sedimentary formations ==
After the assembly of the final shield configuration the territory of Uruguay have been covered by several sedimentary formations ranging from Devonian sandstones to Quaternary loess. All of the sedimentary formations covers only patches of the country since deposition have not been uniform and erosion have cleaned surfaces, creeks and shores.

Sedimentary rocks of Lower Devonian age are found in the central part of Uruguay being exposed as a narrow east-west to northeast oriented band. The upper and better known part of this sequence is made up of sandstone. The lower sandstones of this sequence have characteristics similar to the Furnas Formation of São Paulo in Brazil. During the Late Paleozoic the territory of Uruguay was affected by the Karoo Glaciation and was subsequently covered by ice lobes of the great ice sheet that covered large parts of Gondwana. Glacial striae on shales and varve-like sediments found in Uruguay have been associated with this glaciation.

During the early rifting stages of the South Atlantic the area of southern Paraná Basin suffered a gentle uplifting that deviated sediments into the Tacuarembó region of Uruguay. These changes led to the formation of the Itacuanbú and Tacuarembó formations during the Mid Jurassic to Early Cretaceous. Parts of the Tacuarembó formation came to be preserved thanks to a unit of the Paraná traps, the Arapey basalts, that erupted 132 mya and covered the sediments.

== Paraná traps ==
In the north of Uruguay, volcanic materials from the Paraná continental flood basalt province form a major lithological unit extending beyond Uruguay's borders into Argentina and Brazil, with parts of it now lying in Namibia on the other side of the Atlantic due to plate tectonics. This volcanic material erupted in the Cretaceous period during the opening of the South Atlantic and has been linked to the Tristan da Cunha plume. The bulk of this volcanic material is basalt but there are rhyolites as well. Associated with this volcanism are also syenite and other granitoid intrusions exposed as outcrops in small areas of Southeastern Uruguay. Although volcanic rocks of the Paraná volcanism underlies more than half of Uruguay, they have in many areas been covered by younger sediments so that the lavas only crop out as a geological province in the Uruguayan northwest.

== See also ==
- Paleontology in Uruguay
