= Sierra Bayas Group =

Geological formation in Argentina

- Stratigraphic range: Neoproterozoic
- Type: Stratigraphic group
- Underlies: Cerro Negro Formation; Balcarce Formation
- Overlies: Buenos Aires Complex

Lithology
- Primary: Limestone, shale (inc. argillite), quartzite, dolomite, quartz-arkose
- Other: Diamictite

Location
- Coordinates: 37.316667°S 59.133333°W
- Region: Buenos Aires Province
- Country: Argentina
- Extent: Río de la Plata Craton

Type section
- Named for: Sierra Bayas
- Sierra Bayas Group (Argentina)

Sierra Bayas Group is a group of sedimentary rock formations in Buenos Aires Province, Argentina, that deposited in Neoproterozoic times. The group crops out in the central and northwestern parts of the Tandilia System, a chain of hills made up by of ancient rocks. The nearby Cerro Negro Formation aside, Sierra Bayas Group contains the oldest sedimentary formations in Argentina that have not been subjected to in a significant degree the geological processes of metamorphism and deformation.

== Description ==
Sierra Bayas Group and the former La Tinta Group have equivalents in Southern Africa, in La Tinta Group in particular is considered equivalent to the Nama Group found in Namibia and South Africa. From top to bottom Sierra Bayas Group is subdivided Loma Negra, Olavarría, Cerro Largo, Colombo and Villa Mónica formations. Sierra Bayas Group has a thickness of 175 meters and the age its rocks range from Tonian to Ediacaran.

It was formerly grouped together with Cerro Negro Formation and the Ordivician Balcarce Formation into La Tinta Group.

== See also ==
- Dyke swarms of Tandil and Azul
- Puncoviscana Formation
- Sucunduri Formation
