= Cerro Negro Formation =

Geologic formation in Argentina

- Stratigraphic range: Ediacaran <565 Ma
- Type: Formation
- Unit of: La Providencia Group; Tandilia System
- Underlies: Balcarce Formation
- Overlies: Sierra Bayas Group
- Thickness: >150 m (490 ft)

Lithology
- Primary: Shale, sandstone
- Other: Marl

Location
- Coordinates: 37°12′04.3″S 60°20′48.1″W
- Region: Buenos Aires Province
- Country: Argentina
- Extent: Río de la Plata Craton
- Cerro Negro Formation (Argentina)

The Cerro Negro Formation is a sedimentary formation of Ediacaran age in Buenos Aires Province, Argentina. The formation crops out along the Tandilia System, a chain of hills made up of ancient rocks. Together with the formations of the underlying Sierra Bayas Group it is contains the oldest sedimentary formations in Argentina that have not been subject to significant metamorphism or deformation. In 2015 a complete revision of the formation was proposed.

== Fossil content ==
Soft-bodied discoidal specimens resembling Aspidella are described from the formation, that has been estimated as not older than 565 Ma.

== See also ==
- Dyke swarms of Tandil and Azul
- Puncoviscana Formation
- Nama Group
