= Uruguayan dyke swarms =

Large geological structure in Uruguay

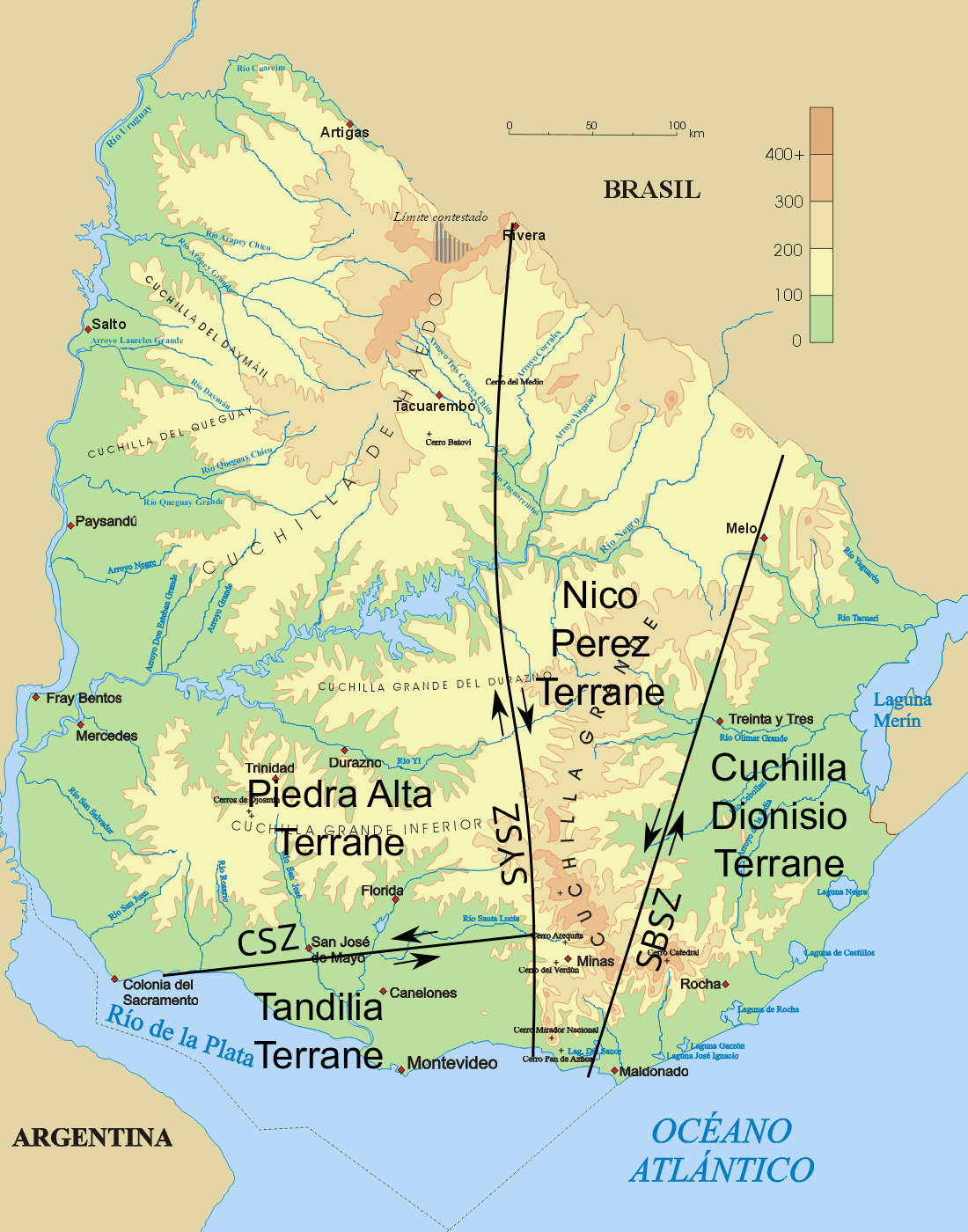
Shear zones and terranes in Uruguay after Gaucher et al. (2008).

The Uruguayan dyke swarms consist of three dyke swarms of Precambrian age that intrude Río de la Plata Craton and Brasiliano Cycle continental crust in Uruguay. The dykes – including the Florida dyke swarm, the Nico Perez dyke swarm, and the Treinta y Tres dyke swarm – are of mafic to intermediate composition and each group lies in a separate tectono-stratigraphic terrane. The rocks of the Florida dyke swarm have been quarried since the 1960s and are used in the construction industry as black dimension stone of very high quality, being marketed as "black granite".

Uruguayan dyke swarms
Name	Intruded terrane	Age	Lithology	Strike
Florida dyke swarm	Piedra Alta Terrane	1.790 ± 5 Ga	Basaltic andesite, andesite	NE-SW, E-W and NW-SE
Nico Perez dyke swarm	Nico Perez Terrane	ca. 0.750 Ga	Basalt, basaltic andesite	NNE-SSW
Treinta y Tres dyke swarm	Cuchilla-Dionisio terrane	ca. 0.750 Ga	Basalt	NNE-SSW

== Florida dyke swarm ==
The Florida dyke swarm (also known as Piedra Alta dyke swarm and Uruguayan dyke swarm) crops out in the Piedra Alta Terrane of Río de la Plata Craton west of Sarandí del Yí Shear Zone. The strike of the dykes has an arcuate pattern: it changes from west to east from NE-SW to E-W and then near the shear zone to NW-SE. The Florida dykes have dips between 90° and 70°. Common thicknesses are of 20–30 metres (66–98 ft), with occasional dykes reaching thicknesses of 50 metres (160 ft) and 80 metres (260 ft) and the smaller dykes being 0.5 metres (1 ft 8 in). The dykes are made up of basaltic andesite and andesite of the tholeiitic magma series. The andesites have higher titanium dioxide contents and are usually darker and more massive, two characteristics that make them more valuable as decorative stone. The basalts instead have lower titanium dioxide contents and grey colors. The dykes made up of basalt might be slightly younger than the andesite dykes.

Despite having some characteristics similar to those of igneous rocks formed near subduction zones, the Florida dyke swarm rocks are unlikely to have formed in such environment. Instead, the magma that formed the dykes is thought to be derived from the partial melting of garnet peridotite in a parcel of the Earth's mantle that was metasomatized without the direct influence of subduction. These dykes are of Late Paleoproterozoic age. Nearby rapakivi granites of the Illescas Batholith are related to the dyke swarm. By the time of intrusion of the Florida dyke swarm, Piedra Alta Terrane was experiencing extensional tectonics.

== Nico Perez dyke swarm ==
Tholeiitic basalt and basaltic andesite are the main rock types of Nico Perez dyke swarm. Before solidifying as dykes the magmas fractionated minerals at relatively shallow (upper crust) magma chambers. The dykes of the swarm have geochemical heterogeinities that indicate they did not originate from the same magmas. Despite having geochemical characteristics typical of subduction zone magmatism the dykes are judged unlikely to have formed in such environment and are instead considered an example of intraplate magmatism.

== Treinta y Tres dyke swarm ==
The Treinta y Tres dyke swarm intrude Brasiliano Cycle granitoids that crop out east of Sierra Ballena Shear Zone. The dykes are about 750 million years old (Neoproterozoic). Compared to the two other Uruguayan dyke swarms the Treinta y Tres dyke swarm originated from lower degrees of partial melting in the mantle, but of similar garnet peridotite sources.
