= Archaeogaia =

Archaeogaia Temporal range: Early-Middle Paleocene (Tiupampan-Peligran) ~62–60 Ma

Scientific classification
- Kingdom: Animalia
- Phylum: Chordata
- Class: Mammalia
- Order: †Notoungulata
- Genus: †Archaeogaia; Zimicz et al, 2020

Type species
- Archaeogaia macachaae Zimicz et al, 2020

Extinct genus of notoungulates

Archaeogaia is an extinct genus of notoungulates that lived during the Early and Middle Paleocene of what is now Argentina. It is one of the oldest known unequivocal notoungulates.

== Description ==
This animal is only known from a fragmentary left mandible preserving three molars. Archaeogaia was characterized by a first molar slightly shorter than the second, both being larger than the third, all of them being low-crowned (brachydont); a talonid shorter than the trigonid, a metaconid distally positioned and taller than the protoconid, a reduced paraconid on the second molar, a straight metalophid on the second and third molar (running mesially to form an obtuse angle in the labial margin on the second molar, and more traversally on the third), a transversal entoloph, a mesial cingulid extending from the medial area to the lingual area on the molars, and a distal cingulid connected with the hypoconulid with the mesial surface of the entoconid on the second and third molars.

== Classification ==
Archaeogaia macachaae was first described in 2020, based on a single fossil from the Mealla Formation, in the Salta Province of Argentina. Due to the presence of a transversal entolophid and to features of the protolophid, metalophid and hypolophid, Archaeogaia is considered a member of the Notoungulata. It is however unclear which phylogenetic position it occupied within the group, due to the extreme fragmentation and to the plesiomorphic characteristics of the holotype fossil. Archaeogaia is considered to be the oldest known notoungulate, perhaps along the better known Henricosborniidae Simpsonotus.
