= Mealla Formation =

Geological formation in northwestern Argentina

- Stratigraphic range: Mid-Late Paleocene (Peligran-Riochican); ~59–56 Ma
- Type: Geological formation
- Unit of: Salta Group; Santa Bárbara Subgroup
- Underlies: Maíz Gordo Formation
- Overlies: Yacoraite Formation
- Thickness: 100–150 m (330–490 ft)

Lithology
- Primary: Sandstone, siltstone
- Other: Conglomerate, paleosols

Location
- Coordinates: 23.1°S 65.6°W
- Approximate paleocoordinates: 25.9°S 53.8°W
- Region: Jujuy Province
- Country: Argentina
- Extent: Salta Basin
- Mealla Formation (Argentina)

The Mealla Formation is a geological formation of the Santa Bárbara Subgroup, part of the Salta Group in the Salta Basin in northwestern Argentina whose strata date back to the Middle to Late Paleocene of the Paleogene.

== Description ==
The Mealla Formation comprises sandstones ranging upward to siltstones with a basal conglomerate bed. The formation unconformably overlies the Yacoraite Formation and is overlain by the Thanetian Maíz Gordo Formation. The thickness of the formation ranges from 100 to 150 metres (330 to 490 ft). The formation is the lowermost unit in the Santa Bárbara Subgroup, representing the post-rift phase of the Salta Basin. The Mealla Formation was deposited in a fluvial environment. Other parts of the formation contain freshwater stromatolites, interpreted as deposited in a shallow lacustrine environment.

The basal conglomerate is 3.5 metres (11 ft) thick, matrix-supported with 80% of the clasts coming from quartzites from the Cambrian Mesón Group, with the remainder of the clasts provenanced by the Precambrian Puncoviscana Formation and the quartzarenites of the Santa Victoria Group. The conglomeratic section also contains paleosols. The pollen analysis performed by Quattrocchio et al. in 1997 indicated a phase of higher aridity during the deposition of the Mealla Formation.

The formation was initially described as Riochican, and later as Itaboraian, but after the redefinition of the Itaboraí Formation to Early Eocene, the Mealla Formation is Peligran to Riochican in age. The Mealla Formation is correlated with the Río Loro Formation that crops out in the Sierras Pampeanas to the southeast of the Salta Basin.

== Fossil content ==
The following fossils were reported from the formation:

- Mammals
  - Notoungulata
    - Archaeogaia macachaae
    - Notoungulata - Henricosborniidae
      - Simpsonotus major
      - S. praecursor
- Reptiles
  - Pelomedusidae indet.
  - Sebecus ayrampu
- Snakes
  - Powellophis andina
- Pollen
  - Aquifoliaceae
    - Gemmatricolpites subsphaericus
  - Haloragaceae
    - Myriophyllumpollenites sp.
  - Oenotheraceae
    - Corsinipollenites menendezii
  - Pandanaceae
    - Pandaniidites texus
  - Salicaceae
    - Rousea patagonica
  - Ulmaceae (Phyllostylon)
    - Verrustephanoporites simplex

== See also ==
- South American land mammal ages
- Itaboraí Formation
