= Mesón Group =

Geological formation in South America

- Stratigraphic range: Cambrian-Tremadocian
- Type: Group
- Sub-units: Lizoite Fm. Campanario Fm. Chahualmayoc Fm.
- Underlies: Santa Victoria Group
- Overlies: Puncoviscana Formation

Lithology
- Primary: Sandstone, siltstone, limestone

Location
- Coordinates: 23.0°S 65.0°W
- Approximate paleocoordinates: 45.4°S 128.9°W
- Region: Jujuy, Salta, Tucumán; Potosí Department
- Country: Argentina; Bolivia
- Mesón Group (Argentina)

Mesón Group (Spanish: Grupo Mesón) is a Cambrian to Early Ordovician sedimentary group located in the Argentine Northwest and nearby parts of Bolivia. The group members rest unconformably on top of the Ediacaran–Cambrian Puncoviscana Formation. According to G.F. Aceñolaza, the Mesón Basin – the sedimentary basin in which the Méson Group was deposited – was located between the Arequipa and Río de la Plata Cratons.

== Stratigraphy ==
The Mesón Group comprises three formations: Chahualmayoc Formation at the top, Lizoite Formation at the base and Campanario Formation in-between. The group is composed of sandstones, siltstones and limestones.

== Fossil content ==
The group has provided fossils of:

Trilobites

- Asaphellus sp.
- Notopeltis sp.

Other

- Macrocystella sp.
