= Nanolophodon =

Nanolophodon Temporal range: Early Eocene ~55–52 Ma

Scientific classification
- Domain: Eukaryota
- Kingdom: Animalia
- Phylum: Chordata
- Class: Mammalia
- Order: †Notoungulata
- Family: †Henricosborniidae
- Genus: †Nanolophodon; Castro et al, 2021

Type species
- Nanolophodon tutuca Castro et al, 2021

Extinct genus of notoungulates

Nanolophodon is an extinct genus of mammal, belonging to the order Notoungulata. It lived during the Early Eocene, and its fossilized remains were discovered in what is now Brazil.

== Description ==
This genus is only known from fragments of its maxilla and mandible, and from a few isolated teeth. The teeth were low-crowned (brachydont). The lower molars had an underdeveloped entolophid, a common characteristic with other early Notoungulates, such as Henricosbornia. The first crest, generally present in members of the suborder Typotheria, and the intermediate crest, present in members of the suborder Toxodontia, were absent. Nanolophodon was distinguished from its relatives by the presence of two small crests on the ectoloph, and a large paraconid.

== Classification ==
Nanolophodon tutuca was first described in 2021, based on fossilized remains found in the Itaboraí Formation, in the Rio de Janeiro State of Brazil. Nanolophodon (meaning in Neo-Latin "tooth with minuscule crest") is considered to be a basal member of the order Notoungulata, perhaps representative of the potentially paraphyletic family Henricosborniidae.

== Bibliography ==
- Luis Otavio Rezende Castro, Daniel A. García-López, Lilian Paglarelli Bergqvist, e Hermínio Ismael De Araújo-Júnior, A New Basal Notoungulate from the Itaboraí Basin (Paleogene) of Brazil Ameghiniana 58(3), 272-288, 30 giugno 2021. https://doi.org/10.5710/AMGH.05.02.2021.3387
