= Goianides Ocean =

Ocean in South America in Neoproterozoic

The Goianides Ocean was an ocean that existed in South America in Neoproterozoic times. It separated the Paranapanema block and the São Francisco Craton. Its closure started with a magmatic arc forming (now seen as granitoids of the Guaxupé and Socorro Nappes) and eventually gave rise to the Brasiliano orogeny.

== See also ==
- Brasiliano orogeny
