= Dyke swarms of Tandil and Azul =

Large geological structure in Argentina

The dyke swarms of Tandil and Azul are groups of dykes of Proterozoic age located in Buenos Aires Province, Argentina. The dyke swarms consist of two groups: 2000 million year old dykes of calc-alkaline type and 1600 million year old dykes of tholeiitic type.

== Description ==
The tholeiitic dykes are made up of diabase and titanium-rich basalt, in contrast the calc-alkaline dykes are made up of andesite and rhyolite. The dyke swarms intrude the southern part of the Río de la Plata Craton, much the same way the Uruguayan dyke swarms intrude the northeastern part of the craton.

The calc-alkaline dykes intruded in a period of transtensional tectonics during the Transamazonian orogeny, while the tholeiitic dykes intruded during the period of extensional tectonics that succeeded the orogeny.
