= Alkapeca =

Former tectonostratigraphic terrane in the Mediterranean Sea

Alkapeca, also called Mesomediterranean terrane, is the name given to the terrane located 10 million years ago inside the Tethyan domain, between the Iberian plates and Europe to the north, Apulia to the east and Africa to the south.

Van Dijk & Scheepers place it in parallel with Sardinia and Corsica, on the edge of the European continent, inside the "Trans Mediterranean Bridge".

The Alkapeca terrane was made up of present-day Kabylia, Sicily, and Sardinia. It probably acquired its individuality only from the Toarcian. Previously, the Alkapeca still had to be part of the margin of the Iberia plate. Today Sicily and Sardinia are islands while Kabylia is attached to the African continent on Algerian territory and Calabria is attached to the European continent on Italian territory.

== Etymology ==
AlKaPeCa is composed of the initials of Alboran, Kabylia, Peloritani, and Calabria.
