= Othnielmarshia =

Othnielmarshia Temporal range: Paleocene-Eocene ~58–40 Ma

Scientific classification
- Kingdom: Animalia
- Phylum: Chordata
- Class: Mammalia
- Order: †Notoungulata
- Family: †Henricosborniidae
- Genus: †Othnielmarshia; Ameghino 1901

Type species
- †Othnielmarshia lacunifera Ameghino, 1901

Species
- O. curvicrista Ameghino 1901; O. lacunifera Ameghino 1901; O. reflexa Ameghino 1901

Synonyms
- Postpithecus Ameghino 1901

Extinct genus of mammals

Othnielmarshia is an extinct genus of placental mammal from the Paleocene and the Eocene of South America, belonging to the family Henricosborniidae within the order Notoungulata. It was named after the famous paleontologist Othniel Charles Marsh.

== Description ==
This genus is mainly known from its brachyodont and bunolophodont molars. The upper molars had generally a very scanty crochet, in many cases completely absent. Only the first and second upper molars consistently had an hypocone. Unlike Henricosbornia, Othnielmarshia had a sharp labial cingulum. The third molar did not have a metastyle, or it was weakly developed. For the lower molars, the hypoconulid is more difficult to differentiate and the entoconid is more conical and closer from the hypoconulid than in Henricosbornia.
