= Otronia =

Otronia Temporal range: Eocene ~48–42 Ma

Scientific classification
- Kingdom: Animalia
- Phylum: Chordata
- Class: Mammalia
- Order: †Notoungulata
- Family: †Notostylopidae
- Genus: †Otronia; Roth 1901

Type species
- †Otronia muehlbergi Roth, 1901

Species
- O. muehlbergi Roth 1901

Synonyms
- Otrhonia Roth 1901 – alternative spelling

Extinct genus of mammals

Otronia is an extinct genus of notoungulate, belonging to the Notostylopidae family. It lived during the Late Eocene, and its remains were discovered in South America.

== Description ==
This animal was approximately the size of a modern racoon, and its length may have been around 60–70 centimeters excluding the tail. The skull was 14–15 centimeters long, and the animal may have been close to 10 kilograms.

Otronia had a robust and square skull, characterised by its specialized dentition. As well as in some of its relatives, such as Notostylops, there was a noticeable diastema between the anterior teeth and the premolars. In Otronia this diastema was more elongated than in other genera, and the crown of the molars was higher (hypsodont). The first pair of upper incisors were quite large and directed downwards.

== Classification ==
Otronia muehlbergi was first described in 1901 by Santiago Roth, based on a fossil found in Argentina near the Lago Musters (hence its name, derived from the lake local name, Otròn), in terrains dating from the Eocene.

Otronia was a notostylopid, a group of notoungulates with a curious mixture of basal and derived characteristics. Otronia may have been one of the more specialized forms of the family, and is also one of the latest known forms from it.

== Paleoecology ==
Otronia was a terrestrial animal, feeding on leaves and fruits. There is no animal from modern South America sharing the same dentition, but it is vaguely similar to that of the Australian koala, an arboreal animal.

== Bibliography ==
- G. G. Simpson. 1948. The beginning of the age of mammals in South America. Part I. Bulletin of the American Museum of Natural History 91:1-232
- G. G. Simpson. 1967. The Ameghinos' localities for early Cenozoic mammals in Patagonia. Bulletin of the Museum of Comparative Zoology 136:63-76
- Darin A. Croft, Illustrated by Velizar Simeonovski. 2016. Horned Armadillos and Rafting Monkeys-TheFascinating Fossil Mammals of South America
