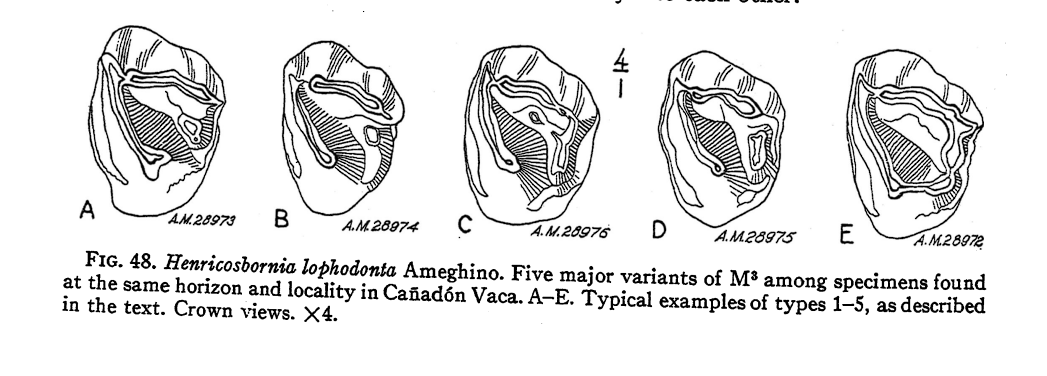
- Henricosbornia

Scientific classification
- Domain: Eukaryota
- Kingdom: Animalia
- Phylum: Chordata
- Class: Mammalia
- Order: †Notoungulata
- Family: †Henricosborniidae
- Genus: †Henricosbornia; Ameghino 1901

Type species
- †Henricosbornia lophodonta Ameghino, 1901

Species
- H. ampla Simpson 1948; H. lophodonta Ameghino 1901; H. minuta Roth 1904

Synonyms
- Genus synonymy: Hemistylops Ameghino 1904; Microstylops Ameghino 1901; Monolophodon Roth 1903; Pantostylops Ameghino 1901; Polystylops Ameghino 1904; Prohyracotherium Ameghino 1902; Selenoconus Ameghino 1901; Species synonymy: Hemistylops paucicuspidatus Ameghino 1904; Hemistylops trigonostyloides Ameghino 1904; Henricosbornia alouatina Ameghino 1904; Henricosbornia subconica Ameghino 1904; Henricosbornia waitehor Simpson 1935; Microstylops clarus Ameghino 1901; Microstylops monoconus Ameghino 1904; Pantostylops completus Ameghino 1902; Pantostylops incompletus Ameghino 1901; Peripantostylops orehor Simpson 1935; Polystylops progediens Ameghino 1904; Prohyracotherium matunitum Ameghino 1902; Prohyracotherium patagonicum Ameghino 1902; Selenoconus centralis Ameghino 1901; Selenoconus senex Ameghino 1901; Selenoconus spiculatus Ameghino 1902

= Henricosbornia =

Henricosbornia Temporal range: Late Paleocene-Middle Eocene (Peligran ~58–45 Ma

Extinct genus of notoungulates

Henricosbornia is an extinct genus of henricosborniid notoungulate that lived from the Late Paleocene to the Middle Eocene of what is now Argentina and Brazil.

== Description ==
This animal is mostly known from its fossilized teeth, and any reconstruction of it is therefore only hypothetical. The dentition of Henricosbornia was primitive in that it had no diastema, and the molars and premolars were low-crowned (brachydont). All the upper molars were triangular in section, and devoid of hypoconus. The crest of the trigonid was oblique, and the metaconid was higher than the protoconid. The entoconid was posterior, and took the form of a transversal crest. The species Henricosbornia lophodonta exhibits a large intraspecific variability in the metaloph morphology.

== Classification ==
The genus Henricosbornia was first described in 1901 by Florentino Ameghino, based on fossil remains found in terrains dating from the Early Eocene of Argentina, in the Chubut Province. In a few years, Ameghino described numerous remains of teeth from the same area and considered them as belonging to various species of notoungulates, which he named Hericosbornia lophodonta (the type species), Hemistylops paucicuspidatus, Hemistylops trigonostyloides, Pantostylops completus, Microstylops monoconus, Prohyracotherium patagonicum, Microstylops clarus, Selenoconus spiculatus, Prohyracotherium matutinum. The generic name is derived from the famous paleontologist Henry Fairfield Osborn. All these species were later identified as Henricosbornia lophodonta by George Gaylord Simpson, who identified the numerous dental remains as intraspecific variations.

Several other species were attributed to the genus, some of them still considered valid; Henricosbornia ampla, the youngest species, was found in deposits dating to the Middle Eocene as well as H. minuta. One of the species described by Ameghino in 1901, Pantostylops typus, may have been a distinct species of Henricosbornia. Fossils attributed to the genus were also discovered in slightly more ancient, Late Paleocene terrains of Argentina.

Given its archaic characteristics, Henricosbornia is considered to be one of the most basal notoungulates. It is the eponymous genus of Henricosborniidae, a family including the most basal notoungulates, and classically associated with the Notostylopidae within the probably paraphyletic suborder Notioprogonia. It is related to Nanolophodon.
