= Illescas Batholith =

Geological complex in Uruguay

Illescas Batholith is a geological complex located in Uruguay made up of various plutons including rapakivi granite and quartz syenite. The batholith is of Late Paleoproterozoic age. The batholith originated and was emplaced in an anorogenic tectonic setting during a period of extensional tectonics. The batholith intrudes the Valentines Granulitic Complex of Nico Perez Terrane. The Florida dyke swarm is related to the Illescas Batholith.
