= Adamastor Ocean =

Precambrian "proto-Atlantic" ocean in the Southern Hemisphere

The Adamastor Ocean was a "proto-Atlantic" ocean that formed with the break-up of the Rodinia supercontinent c. 780–750 Ma. It separated the Río de la Plata Craton from the Congo Craton. The inversion of the Adamastor Ocean began about 640 Ma with the development of a large back-arc basin along the western margin of the Kalahari Craton, and the ocean closed when Río de la Plata collided with Kalahari about 545 Ma along the sinistral Sierra Ballena Shear Zone. The São Francisco Craton and the Río de la Plata Craton amalgamated 630–620 Ma, closing the Adamastor Ocean on the South American side and forming the Mantiqueira Mountains around 600 Ma.

In 2020 a group of geologists proposed an alternative model for the Adamastor Ocean in which it is reduced to an intracontinental rift system with only some minor oceanic crust developing in its southern part.

== Etymology ==
South African geologist Chris Hartnady named the Precambrian ocean after the mythical giant Adamastor from Luís de Camões's poem Os Lusíadas which celebrates Vasco da Gama's discovery of the sea route to India. Hartnady thought it an appropriate name since the demigod was transformed into stone and personified the Cape of Storms and since Atlas and Iapetus are associated with the oceans of the northern Atlantic, the North Atlantic Ocean and the Iapetus Ocean respectively.

== Geological history ==
The Adamastor Ocean was narrow in the north, perhaps similar to the Red Sea, but widened southward. Carbon isotope analyses indicate that the ocean water was strongly stratified and thus that it must have been a closed ocean, similar to the Mediterranean, but probably covered by ice during the Sturtian and Marinoan glaciations.

Ocean floor adjacent to the Marmora Terrane (near the Orange River in South Africa) formed c. 740–580 Ma, dates that represent the first rifting and the first accretion respectively. The Adamastor Ocean closed in three episodes: the Río de la Plata Craton first collided with the Congo Craton, which then collided with the Kalahari Craton, which finally collided with Río de la Plata.

== See also ==
- Brasiliano orogeny
- Geology of Namibia
- Geology of South Africa
