= Salta Basin =

- Cuenca Salta
- Location of the basin in Argentina
- Coordinates: 23°40′S 66°07′W
- Etymology: Salta Province
- Region: Argentine Northwest
- Country: Argentina; Bolivia; Chile
- States: Salta, Jujuy, Tucumán; Potosí; Antofagasta
- Cities: Salta

Characteristics
- On/Offshore: Onshore
- Boundaries: Andes
- Part of: Andean foreland basins

Geology
- Basin type: Foreland-on-rift basin or intracontinental rift basin
- Plate: South American
- Orogeny: Andean
- Age: Neocomian-Neogene
- Stratigraphy: Stratigraphy

Salta Basin or Salta Rift Basin is a sedimentary basin located in the Argentine Northwest. The basin started to accumulate sediments in the Early Cretaceous (Neocomian) and at present it has sedimentary deposits reaching thicknesses of 5,000 metres (16,000 ft). The basin contains seven sub-basins: Tres Cruces, Lomas de Olmedo, Metán, Alemanía, Salfity, El Rey, Sey and Brealito. The basin environment has variously been described as a "foreland rift" and an "intra-continental rift". The basin developed under conditions of extensional tectonics and rift-associated volcanism.

== Description ==
The basin basement is composed of rocks belonging to the Puncoviscana Formation. The volcanism that began in the Late Jurassic was initially of subalkaline character (low sodium and potassium content), but turned increasingly alkaline in the Early Cretaceous.

The rifts of Salta Basin developed in a time of generalized extensional tectonics along western South America. It has been proposed that the Salar de Atacama depression in Chile was once a westward rift arm of the Salta Basin.

=== Stratigraphy ===
Age	Group	Subgroup	Formation	Lithologies	Basin stage	Notes
Pliocene	Payogastilla		San Felipe	Conglomerates	Foreland	
Huayquerian	Payogastilla	Jujuy	Piquete		Foreland	
Huayquerian	Payogastilla	Jujuy	Guanaco Sonso		Foreland	
Montehermosan	Payogastilla		Palo Pintado		Foreland	
Chasicoan	Payogastilla		Palo Pintado		Foreland	
Laventan	Payogastilla		Angastaco		Foreland	
Friasian	Payogastilla		Angastaco		Foreland	
Friasian	Payogastilla	Metán	Jesús María		Foreland	
Friasian	Payogastilla	Metán	Anta		Foreland	
Early Miocene	Payogastilla	Metán	Río Seco		Foreland	
Priabonian	Payogastilla		Los Colorados		Foreland	
Casamayoran	Payogastilla		Quebrada de los Colorados		Foreland	
Casamayoran	Salta	Santa Bárbara	Lumbrera		Late post-rift	
Lutetian	Salta	Santa Bárbara	Lumbrera		Late post-rift	
Itaboraian	Salta	Santa Bárbara	Maíz Gordo		Late post-rift	
Thanetian	Salta	Santa Bárbara	Maíz Gordo		Late post-rift	
Peligran	Salta	Santa Bárbara	Mealla	Sandstones, siltstones, conglomerates, paleosols	Late post-rift	
Selandian	Salta	Balbuena	Tunal		Early post-rift	
Danian	Salta	Balbuena	Olmedo		Early post-rift	
Danian	Salta	Balbuena	Yacoraite	Sandstones, limestones	Early post-rift	
Maastrichtian	Salta	Balbuena	Yacoraite	Sandstones, limestones	Early post-rift	
early Maastrichtian	Salta	Balbuena	Lecho	Sandstones	Early post-rift	
Campanian	Salta	Pirgua	Los Blanquitos	Sandstones	Late synrift	
Campanian	Salta	Pirgua	Las Curtiembres		Early synrift	
Santonian	Salta	Pirgua	Las Curtiembres		Early synrift	
Coniacian	Salta	Pirgua	Las Curtiembres		Early synrift	
Turonian	Salta	Pirgua	Las Curtiembres		Early synrift	
Cenomanian	Salta	Pirgua	Isonza	Basalt	Early synrift	
Albian	Salta	Pirgua	La Yesera		Early synrift	
Aptian	Salta	Pirgua	La Yesera		Early synrift	
