= Simpsonotus =

Simpsonotus Temporal range: Mid-Late Paleocene (Peligran) ~60–56 Ma

Scientific classification
- Domain: Eukaryota
- Kingdom: Animalia
- Phylum: Chordata
- Class: Mammalia
- Order: †Notoungulata
- Family: †Henricosborniidae
- Genus: †Simpsonotus; Pascual et al. 1978

Type species
- †Simpsonotus praecursor Pascual et al. 1978

Species
- Simpsonotus major Pascual et al. 1978; Simpsonotus praecursor (type) Pascual et al. 1978

Extinct genus of notoungulates

Simpsonotus is an extinct genus of notoungulate mammals in the family Henricosborniidae from the Middle to Late Paleocene of South America. Fossils of the genus have been found in the Mealla Formation, a fluvial and lacustrine sedimentary unit of the Salta Basin in northwestern Argentina. The genus name honors paleontologist George Gaylord Simpson.

== Description ==
Simpsonotus had a skull similar to Notostylops, but with a shorter and rounder face. The genus contains two species; the type species S. praecursor, and the double-sized S. major, both described by Pascual et al. in 1978.

== Age ==
The Mealla Formation was initially described as Riochican in the South American land mammal age classification, and later as Itaboraian, but after the redefinition of the Itaboraí Formation to Early Eocene, the Mealla Formation is Peligran in age.
