= Brasiliano orogeny =

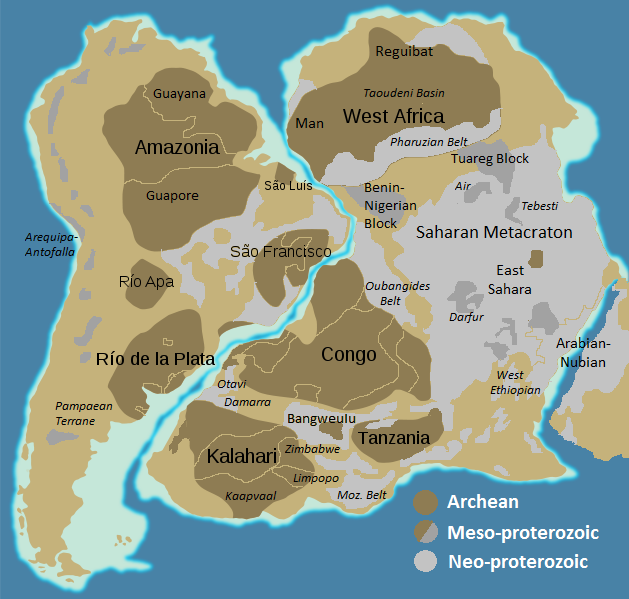
West Gondwana with major cratons in brown and Pan-African orogenies in grey

Brasiliano orogeny or Brasiliano cycle (Portuguese: Orogênese Brasiliana and Ciclo Brasiliano) refers to a series of orogenies from the Neoproterozoic era, exposed chiefly in Brazil but also in other parts of South America. The Brasiliano orogeny is a regional name for the larger Pan-African/Brasiliano orogeny that extended not only in South America but across most of Gondwana. In a wide sense the Brasiliano orogeny includes also the Pampean orogeny. Almeida et al. coined the term Brasiliano Orogenic Cycle in 1973. The orogeny led to the closure of several oceans and aulacogens including the Adamastor Ocean, the Goianides Ocean, the Puncoviscana Ocean (Note: This ocean is also called the Pampean Ocean. The relationship of this ocean and the Puncoviscana Formation is disputed.) and the Peri-Franciscano Ocean.

Attempts to correlate the South American Brasiliano belts with the African Pan-African belts on the other side of the Atlantic have in many cases been problematic.

== Belts and belt provinces ==
Name	Modern location	Nearby cratons	Associated closed ocean	Details
Apiaí Belt	Southeast Brazil, South Brazil			
Araçuaí Belt (Portuguese: Faixa Araçuaí)	Northeast Brazil, Southeast Brazil	São Francisco Craton		The Araçuaí Belt is the western portion of an orogen that included the West Congo orogen. The rifting and opening of the South Atlantic Ocean divided this orogen into an African and a South American part. The Araçuaí Belt lies east of the São Francisco Craton and northeast of the Brasilia and Ribeira belts.
Borborema Province	Northeastern Brazil			The Borborema Province is a geologic province in Northeastern Brazil that contains various Brasiliano orogeny belts. The Borborema Province lies between the São Francisco Craton and the São Luis Craton. The African counterpart and continuation of these belts lies between the Congo Craton and the West African Craton.
Brasilia Belt	Northeastern Brazil, Southeastern Brazil	São Francisco Craton, Paranapanema block		
Dom Feliciano Belt	Southern Brazil, Eastern Uruguay	Río de la Plata Craton	Brazilides Ocean	The Dom Feliciano Belt is an orogenic belt in Southern Brazil and Eastern Uruguay. It has been suggested that the Damara Belt in Southern Africa formed the eastern part of the belt before the South Atlantic rifted. The belt contains the remnants of a volcanic arc that possibly was the result of the subduction of the Adamastor Ocean lithosphere or of lithosphere from a tectonic plate west of the belt. The Dom Feliciano Belt distinctly lacks high temperature metamorphic rocks or evidence for a suture.
Pampean Orogen	Argentina	Río de la Plata Craton	Pampean Ocean	
Paraguai Belt	Central-West Brazil	Amazonian Craton, São Francisco Craton, Paranapanema block, Río de la Plata Craton	Brazilides Ocean	The Paraguai Belt is surrounded by the Amazonian, São Francisco and Río de la Plata cratons. Its oroclinal bend is probably indebted to the irregular shape of the Amazonian Craton. The formation of the Paraguai belt is associated with the closure of the Clymene Ocean. The belt has a similar age of deformation as the Pampean orogen further south in Argentina.
Riacho do Pontal Belt	Northeastern Brazil			
Ribeira Belt (Portuguese: Faixa Ribeira)	Southeastern Brazil	São Francisco Craton, Paranapanema block, Luís Alves Craton	Brazilides Ocean	The Ribeira Belt is a deeply eroded orogen in Southeastern Brazil. The Ribeira Belt resulted from the collision of two continents. Most of the orogenic deformation occurred 590 to 563 million years ago.
Rio Paraná Belt	Central-West Brazil			
Rio Pardo Belt	Northeastern Brazil			
Rio Preto Belt	Northeastern Brazil			
Sergipano Belt	Northeastern Brazil	São Francisco Craton		The Sergipano Belt lies northeast of the São Francisco Craton. The metamorphism of the rocks of the belt reaches the amphibolite facies.

== See also ==
- Trans Brazilian Lineament
