= Peripantostylops =

Peripantostylops Temporal range: Eocene (Ypresian-Lutetian ~56–41.3 Ma

Scientific classification
- Kingdom: Animalia
- Phylum: Chordata
- Class: Mammalia
- Order: †Notoungulata
- Family: †Henricosborniidae
- Genus: †Peripantostylops; Ameghino, 1901

Type species
- †Peripantostylops minutus Ameghino, 1901

Synonyms
- Selenoconus agilis Ameghino 1901

Extinct genus of mammals

Peripantostylops is an extinct genus of notoungulate belonging to the family Henricosborniidae that lived during the Eocene in what is now Argentina.

== Description ==
This animal is mostly known from fossilized molars. Those were low-crowned (brachydont) and bunolophodont. The upper molars had a highly developed crochet unlike other genera of Henricosborniidae. The third molar either doesn't have a metastyle or it is weakly developed. For the lower molars, the hypoconulid is less separated from the hypoconid. The entoconid of the third molar was highly developed as an independent cuspid.
