= Terrane =

Fragment of crust formed on one tectonic plate and accreted to another

In geology, a terrane (/təˈreɪn, ˈtɛreɪn/; in full, a tectonostratigraphic terrane) is a crust fragment formed on a tectonic plate (or broken off from it) and accreted or "sutured" to crust lying on another plate. The crustal block or fragment preserves its distinctive geologic history, which is different from the surrounding areas—hence the term "exotic" terrane. The suture zone between a terrane and the crust it attaches to is usually identifiable as a fault. A sedimentary deposit that buries the contact of the terrane with adjacent rock is called an overlap formation. An igneous intrusion that has intruded and obscured the contact of a terrane with adjacent rock is called a stitching pluton.

There is also an older usage of the term terrane, which described a series of related rock formations or an area with a preponderance of a particular rock or rock group.

== Overview ==
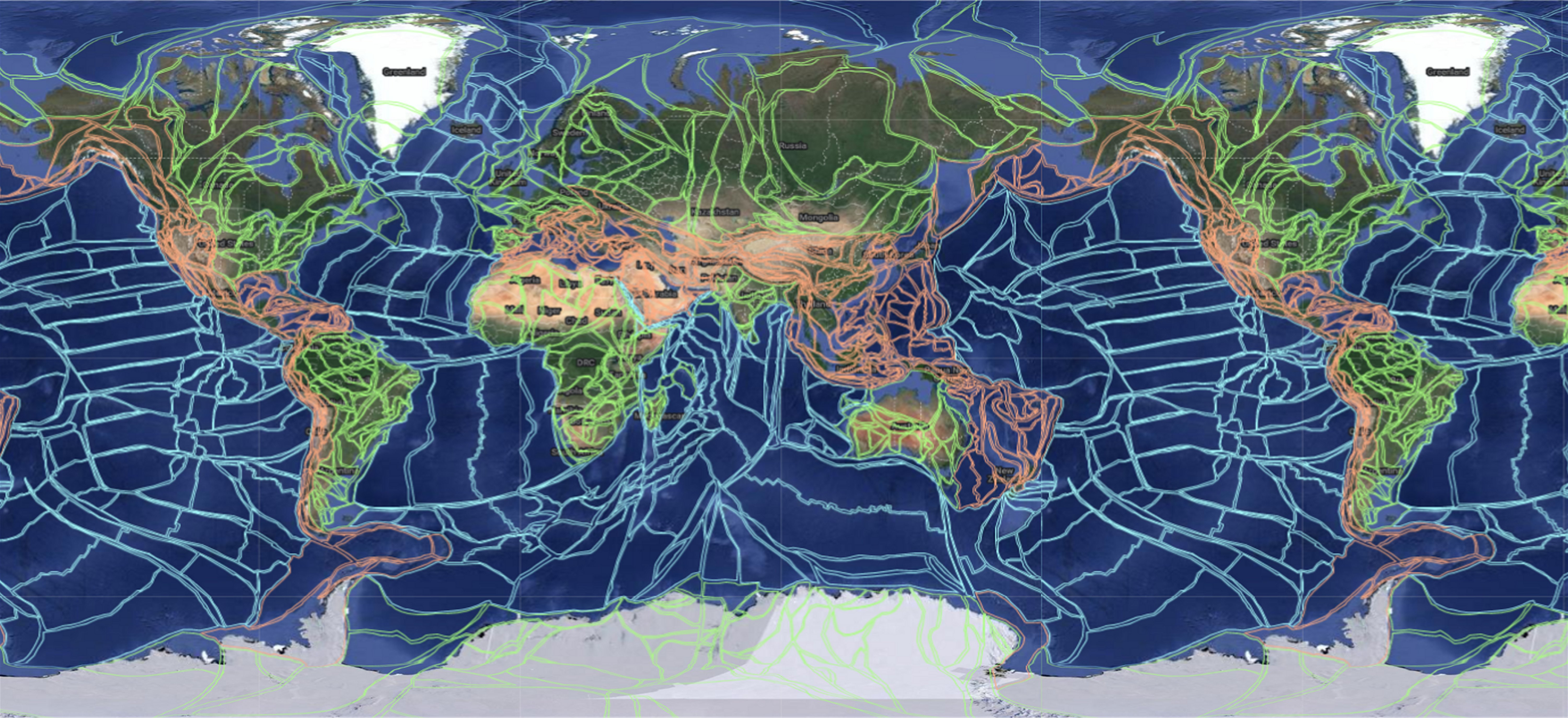
Map showing terranes of Earth's crust. Continental blocks Oceanic plates Mobile zones

Map of Earth's principal lithospheric plates

A tectonostratigraphic terrane did not necessarily originate as an independent microplate, since it may not contain the full thickness of the lithosphere. It is a piece of crust that has been transported laterally, usually as part of a larger plate, and is relatively buoyant due to thickness or low density. When the plate of which it was a part subducted under another plate, the terrane failed to subduct, detached from its transporting plate, and accreted onto the overriding plate. Therefore, the terrane transferred from one plate to the other. Typically, accreting terranes are portions of continental crust which have rifted off another continental mass and been transported surrounded by oceanic crust, or they are old island arcs formed at some distant subduction zones.

A tectonostratigraphic terrane is a fault-bounded package of rocks of at least regional extent characterized by a geologic history that differs from that of neighboring terranes. The essential characteristic of these terranes is that the present spatial relations are incompatible with the inferred geologic histories. Where terranes that lie next to each other possess strata of the same age, they are considered separate terranes only if it can be demonstrated that the geologic evolutions are different and incompatible. There must be an absence of intermediate lithofacies that could link the strata.

The concept of tectonostratigraphic terrane developed from studies in the 1970s of the complicated Pacific Cordilleran orogenic margin of North America, a complex and diverse geological potpourri that was difficult to explain until the new science of plate tectonics illuminated the ability of crustal fragments to "drift" thousands of miles from their origin and attach themselves, crumpled, to an exotic shore. Such terranes were dubbed "accreted terranes" by geologists. Geologist J. N. Carney writes:

It was soon determined that these exotic crustal slices had in fact originated as "suspect terranes" in regions at some considerable remove, frequently thousands of kilometers, from the orogenic belt where they had eventually ended up. It followed that the present orogenic belt was itself an accretionary collage, composed of numerous terranes derived from around the circum-Pacific region and now sutured together along major faults. These concepts were soon applied to other, older orogenic belts, e.g. the Appalachian belt of North America.... Support for the new hypothesis came not only from structural and lithological studies, but also from studies of faunal biodiversity and palaeomagnetism.

When terranes are composed of repeated accretionary events, and hence are composed of subunits with distinct history and structure, they may be called superterranes.

== List of tectonostratigraphic terranes ==
Africa

- Alkapeca
- Birminian terrane
- Kahiltna terrane
- Likasi terrane
- Mozambique Belt

Asia

- Aldan terrane
- Birekte terrane
- Bargusin terrane
- Daldyn terrane
- Magan terrane
- Markha terrane
- Midyan terrane
- Shan–Thai terrane
- Tungus terrane
- Tynda terrane
- Uchur terrane

Taiwan

- Coastal Range terrane
- Longitudinal Valley terrane
- Eastern Central Range terrane
- Western Central Range terrane
- Hsuehshan Range terrane
- Western Foothills terrane
- Coastal Plain terrane

Tibet

- Lhasa terrane
- Qiangtang terrane
- Xigaze terrane
- Bainang terrane
- Zedong terrane
- Dazhuqu terrane

Australasia

- Brook Street terrane
- Buller terrane
- Caples terrane
- East Tasmanian terrane
- Glenburgh terrane
- Dun Mountain–Maitai terrane
- Molong—Monaro terrane
- Murihiku terrane
- Narryer Gneiss terrane
- Takaka terrane
- Torlesse Composite terrane
- Waipapa Composite terrane
- West Tasmanian terrane

Europe

- Alkapeca
- Armorican terrane
- Avalonia
- Avalon Composite terrane
- Balearic terrane
- Briançonnais terrane
- Central Highlands terrane
- Central Southern Uplands terrane
- Charnwood terrane
- Hebridean terrane
- Leinster—Lakesman terrane
- Midland Valley terrane
- North Armorican Composite terrane
- Northern Highlands terrane
- Rosslare—Monian Terranes
- Southern North Sea terrane
- Tregor—La Hague terrane
- Wrekin terrane

Fennoscandia

- Bamble terrane
- Idefjorden terrane
- Kongsberg terrane
- Telemarkia terrane
- Western Gneiss Region

North America

- Avalonia terrane
- Bancroft terrane
- Buffalo Head terrane
- Cache Creek terrane
- Carolina terrane
- Cassiar terrane
- Crescent terrane
- Elzevir terrane
- Frontenac terrane
- Franciscan Complex
- Ganderia terrane
- Hottah terrane
- Insular Superterrane
- Intermontane Plate and Intermontane Belt
- Meguma terrane
- Occidentalia terrane
- Pacific Rim terrane
- Pearya terrane
- Quesnellia
- Salinian Block
- Shuswap terrane
- Slide Mountain terrane
- Smartville Block
- Sonomia terrane
- Steel Mountain terrane
- Stikinia
- Suwannee terrane
- Wrangellia terrane
- Yakutat Block
- Yukon–Tanana terrane

South America

- Arequipa-Antofalla
- Chaitenia
- Chilenia
- Chiloé Block
- Cuchilla Dionisio Terrane
- Cuyania
- Fitz Roy terrane
- Madre de Dios terrane
- Mejillonía
- Nico Pérez terrane
- Pampia
- Paranapanema block
- Piedra Alta terrane
- Tandilia terrane
