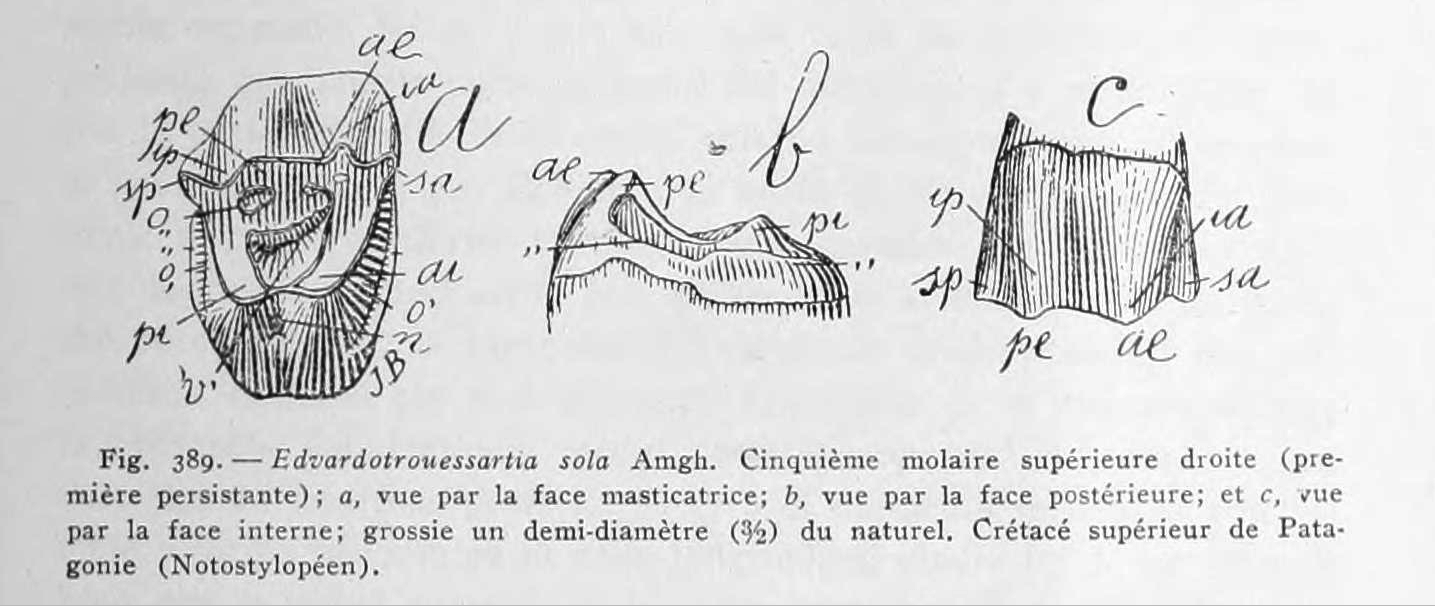

Scientific classification
- Kingdom: Animalia
- Phylum: Chordata
- Class: Mammalia
- Order: †Notoungulata
- Family: †Notostylopidae
- Genus: †Edvardotrouessartia; Ameghino 1901

Type species
- †Edvardotrouessartia sola Ameghino, 1901

Species
- A. sola Ameghino 1901

= Edvardotrouessartia =

Edvardotrouessartia Temporal range: Middle Eocene ~58–45 Ma

Extinct genus of mammals

Edvardotrouessartia is an extinct genus of South American placental mammal that lived during the Middle Eocene of Patagonia. It belonged to the family Notostylopidae, and the order Notoungulata. It is among the many genera of South American ungulates that populated America during much of the Cenozoic, without leaving any modern descendants.

== Etymology ==
Edvardotrouessartia was named to honor the French zoologist Édouard Louis Trouessart.

== Characteristics ==
Edvardotrouessartia is the largest known member of the family Notostylopidae.
