= Henricosborniidae =

Henricosborniidae Temporal range: Late Paleocene-Middle Eocene (Itaboraian-Casamayoran) ~58.7–30 Ma

Scientific classification
- Kingdom: Animalia
- Phylum: Chordata
- Class: Mammalia
- Order: †Notoungulata
- Suborder: †Notioprogonia
- Family: †Henricosborniidae; Ameghino 1901, p. 357

Genera
- †Henricosbornia (type) Ameghino 1901, p. 357; †Orome; †Othnielmarshia Ameghino 1901, p. 358; †Peripantostylops Ameghino 1904, p. 37; †Simpsonotus Pascual, Vucetich & Fernández 1978, p. 374

Synonyms
- Pantostylipidae Ameghino 1901, p. 423; Selenoconidae Ameghino 1902, p. 20

Extinct family of mammals

Henricosborniidae is a family of extinct notoungulate mammals known from the Late Paleocene to Middle Eocene of Argentina, Bolivia and Brazil. The name honors U.S. paleontologist Henry Fairfield Osborn.

== Description ==
Henricosborniidae is a group of primitive notoungulates assigned to the suborder Notioprogonia together with Notostylopidae, not because these two families share any derived features, but because they do not clearly belong to any other clade. The henricosborniids are only known from the late Paleocene and early Eocene (Itaboraian-Casamayoran SALMA, 59 to 48 million years ago), making them slightly older and more primitive than the notostylopids. The henricosborniid dentition is the most generalized and primitive of all notoungulates, and they are believed to be near the source of all notoungulates. They have low teeth crowns and the dental formula 3.1.4.33.1.4.3.

George Gaylord Simpson noted that many of the mammals that Ameghino had, and Simpson himself did, describe from the Río Chico Formation, on the Atlantic coast of Patagonia, are very difficult to distinguish from each other, both on genus and family levels. Often these mammalian groups, including the henricosborniids, are only known from one or a few isolated teeth found only at a single location. Each one of these teeth most likely represents a separate species but these species can not be properly described unless some comparable material is found. McKenna & Bell 1997 synonymized ("= or including") many of the species named by Ameghino and others. Among other things, McKenna & Bell included Postpithecus in Othnielmarshia.

Simpsonotus, with two species found in the Mealla Formation in the Jujuy Province in northwestern Argentina, are the most complete henricosborniids found. Based on features in their auditory region, they might be the most primitive notoungulates discovered. On the other hand, if these primitive features are shared by the other members of the family, Pascual, Vucetich & Fernández 1978 argued that the family should perhaps be recognized as a distinct suborder.
