= Sucunduri Formation =

Geologic formation in Brazil

- Stratigraphic range: Neoproterozoic
- Type: Geological formation
- Unit of: Amazon Basin

Location
- Coordinates: 3.8°S 59.1°W
- Approximate paleocoordinates: 4.2°S 26.5°W
- Region: Nova Olinda do Norte, Amazonas
- Country: Brazil

Type section
- Named for: Sucunduri River
- Nova Olindo do Norte, where the formation crops out

The Sucunduri Formation is a Neoproterozoic geologic formation in Brazil. While reports made in the 1950s state that dinosaur remains were among the fossils that have been recovered from the formation, none of which referred to a specific genus, later research has questioned this interpretation. The formation crops out in Amazonas.

Authors in the 1970s assigned a Permian age to the formation, time equivalent to the Praínha Formation. This definition has been questioned, as the formation is correlated with the Prosperança Formation that overlies the Trombetas Formation. The original report says "...tentatively classed this series of beds as Cretaceous because of its resemblance to part of the Cretaceous section in Maranhão. The outcrop belt of the series is more than 200 km. wide along the Sucunduri River". According to later research, the formation is Neoproterozoic in age and was named after the Sucunduri River, a tributary of the Cunumã River.

== See also ==
- Guiana Shield
