= Sarandí del Yí Shear Zone =

Strike slip shear zone in Uruguay

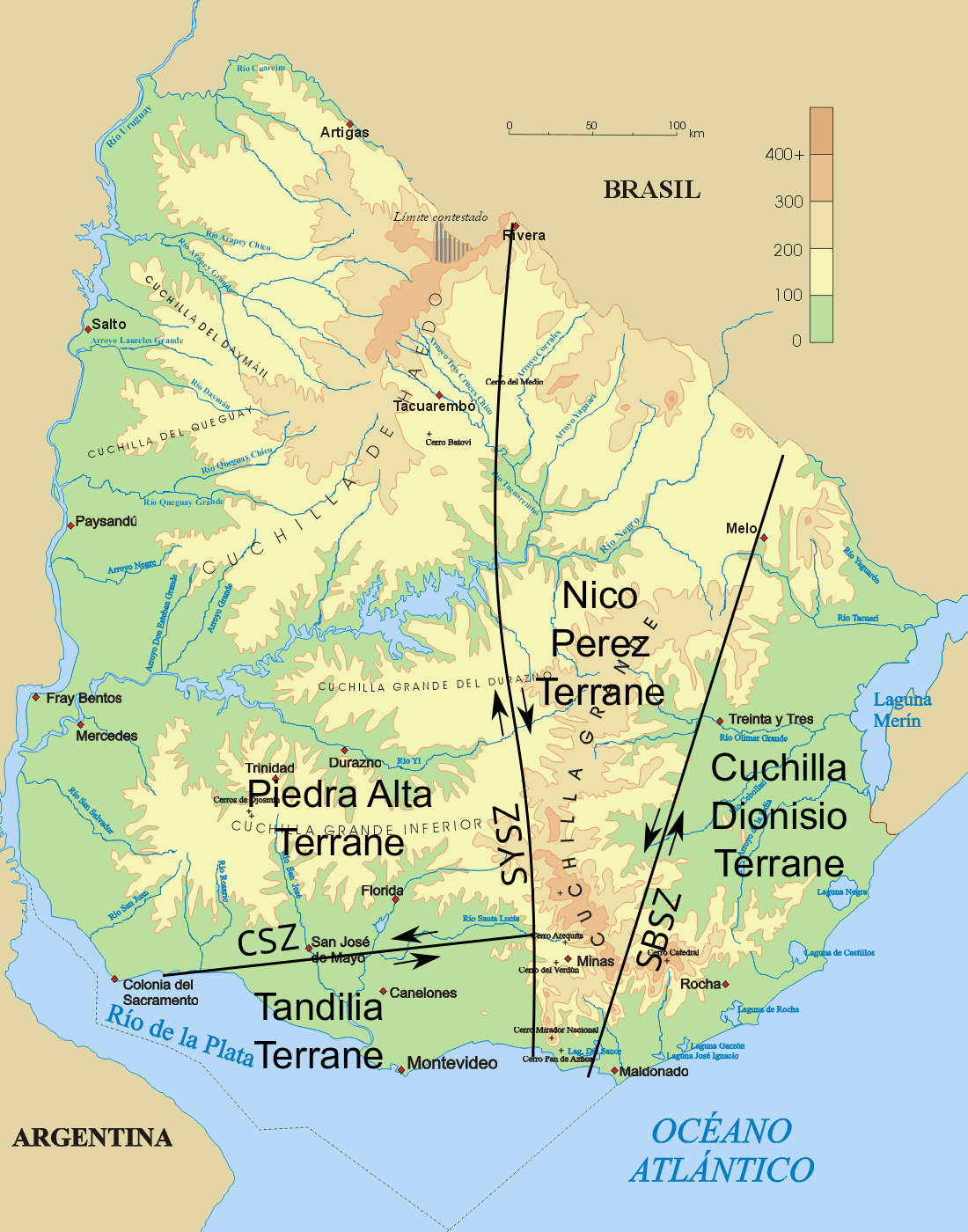
Shear zones and terranes in Uruguay after Gaucher et al., 2008. Sarandí del Yí Shear Zone is marked as "SYSZ". To the east Sierra Ballena Shear Zone is marked as "SBSZ".

The Sarandí del Yí Shear Zone is a strike slip shear zone in Uruguay. The shear zone has a NNW-SSE orientation and a dextral relative direction. It runs across the Río de la Plata Craton from the coast east of Montevideo in the south to the town of Sarandí del Yí. Sarandí del Yí Shear Zone shows a relative displacement of 40 kilometres (25 mi) and truncates the Uruguayan dyke swarm to the west.
