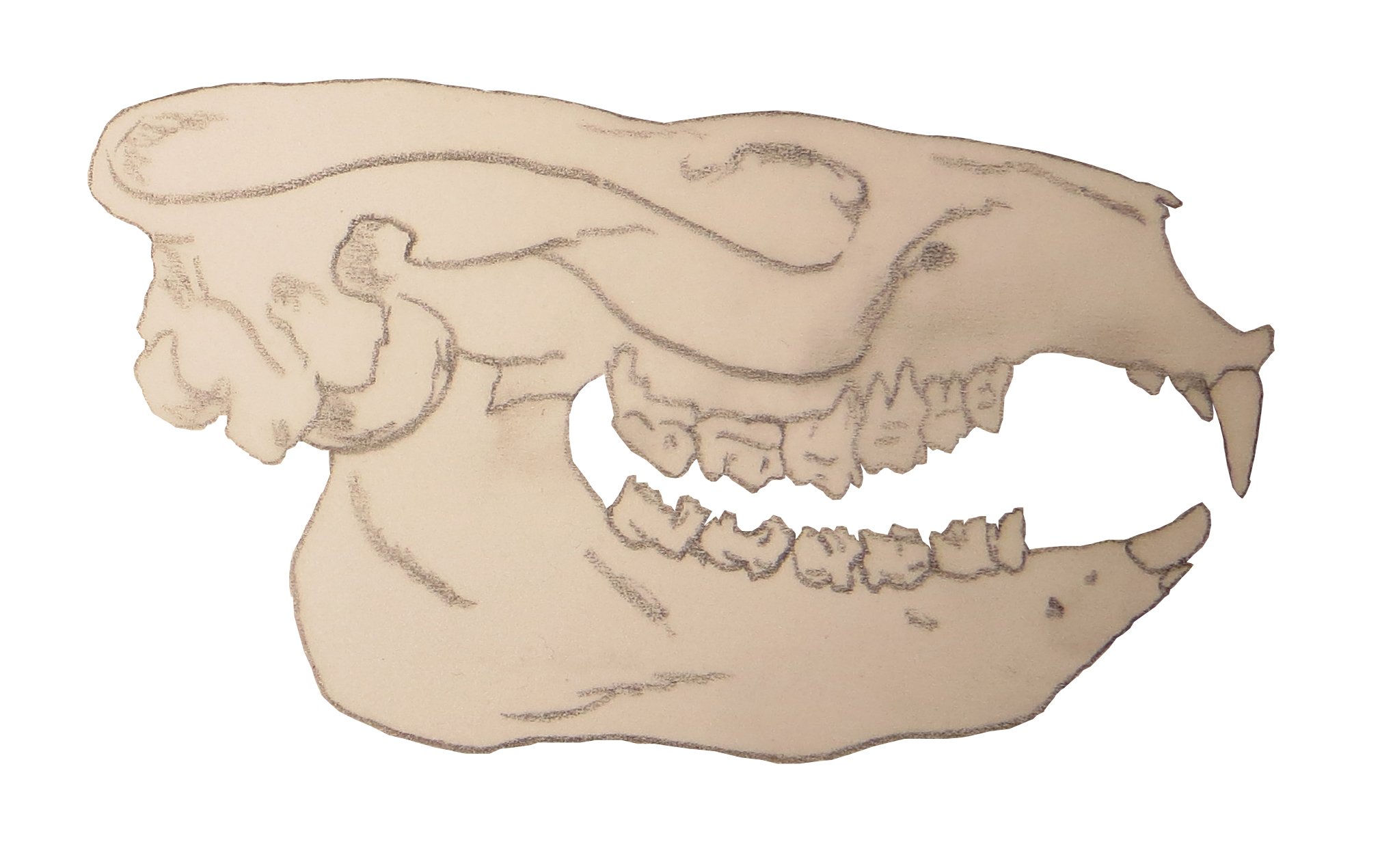
- Skull of Notostylops

Scientific classification
- Kingdom: Animalia
- Phylum: Chordata
- Class: Mammalia
- Order: †Notoungulata
- Suborder: †Notioprogonia
- Family: †Notostylopidae; Ameghino 1897

Genera
- †Boreastylops †Chilestylops †Edvardotrouessartia †Homalostylops †Notostylops †Otronia

= Notostylopidae =

Notostylopidae Temporal range: Late Paleocene-Early Oligocene (Riochican-Tinguirirican) ~58.7–28.4 Ma

Extinct family of mammals

Notostylopidae is an extinct family comprising six genera of notoungulate mammals known from the Late Paleocene (Riochican) to Early Oligocene (Tinguirirican) of Argentina, Brazil and Chile in South America
