= Paranapanema block =

The Paranapanema block is a coherent block of lithosphere located in southeastern South America spanning roughly the same area as the Paraná Basin. The existence of a tectonically stable zone beneath the Paraná Basin was first suggested in 1975. Despite difficulties in accessing the buried Paranapanema block it is inferred it must be composed mostly of orthogneiss and that it existed before the Brasiliano orogeny.

== Description ==
Paranapanema is a triangular block surrounded by structures of the Neoproterozoic Brasiliano orogeny. The northwestern edge faces the Paraguai Belt, probably the remains of an island arc from the Brazilides Ocean. On the northeast edge are the southern end of the Brasilia Belt and the Arenópolis magmatic arc. To the south and southeast are the Apiaí and São Roque belts.

During the Carboniferous, Paranapanema was covered by sediments and during the Early Cretaceous, the Paraná-Etendeka large igneous province added a layer of flood basalts before the South America-Africa breakup.
