= Rapakivi granite =

Type of igneous rock

Rapakivi granite Baltic Brown Granite
- Igneous rock
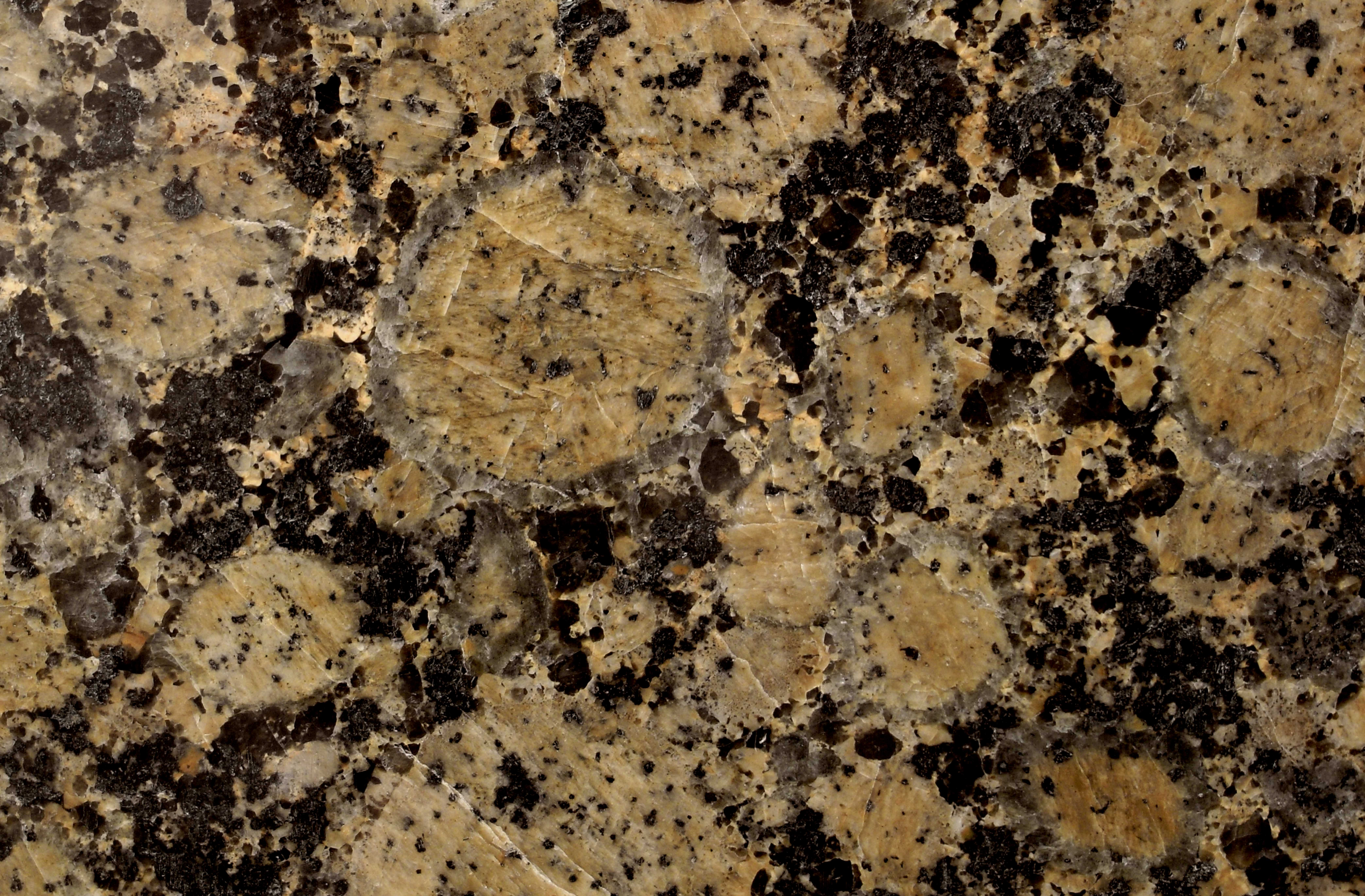

Composition
- Primary: Alkali feldspar; Quartz
- Secondary: Biotite; Plagioclase; Hornblende

Rapakivi granite is an igneous intrusive rock and variant of alkali feldspar granite. It is characterized by large, rounded crystals of orthoclase each with a rim of oligoclase (a variety of plagioclase). Common mineral components include hornblende and biotite. The name has come to be used most frequently as a textural term where it implies plagioclase rims around orthoclase in plutonic (intrusive) rocks. Rapakivi is a Finnish compound of "rapa" (meaning "mud" or "sand", while rapautua means "to erode") and "kivi" (meaning "rock"), because the different heat expansion coefficients of the component minerals make exposed rapakivi crumble easily into sand.

Rapakivi was first described by Finnish petrologist Jakob Sederholm in 1891. Since then, southern Finland's rapakivi granite intrusions have been the type locality of this variety of granite. In the same publication, Sederholm introduced the term rapakivi texture to describe the occurrence of two generations of quartz and alkali feldspar crystals in rapakivi granites, the older alkali feldspar crystals being ovoid-shaped.

== Occurrence ==
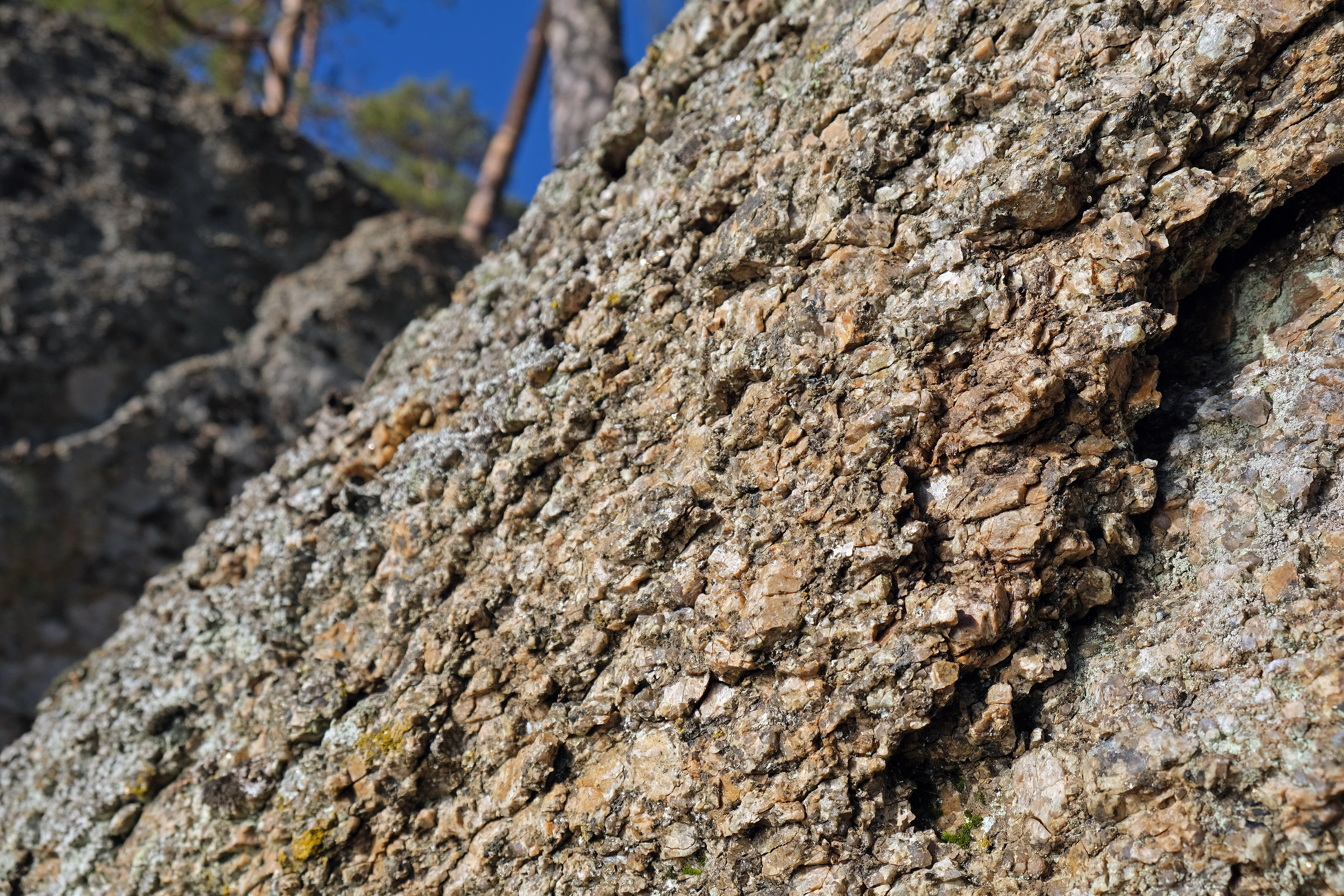
Eroded rapakivi granite in Finland

Rapakivi is a fairly uncommon type of granite, but has been described from localities in North and South America (Illescas Batholith, Uruguay, Rondônia, Brazil) parts of the Baltic Shield, southern Greenland, southern Africa, India and China. Most of these examples are found within Proterozoic metamorphic belts, although both Archaean and Phanerozoic examples are known.

== Formation ==
Finnish Rapakivi granites occur in the Åland, Laitila, Vehmaa, and Wiborg batholiths. The age of the rapakivi granites of the Wiborg batholith ranges between 1646 and 1627 Ma; these granites were intruded into older metamorphic rocks. The Wiborg rapaviki granites consist of 80% wiborgite, and smaller amounts of pyterlite, porphyritic rapakivi granite, even-grained rapakivi granite, and aplitic rapakivi granite.

Rapakivi granites have formation ages from Archean to recent and are usually attributed to anorogenic tectonic settings. They have formed in shallow (a few km deep) sills of up to 10 km thickness.

Rapakivi granites are often found associated with intrusions of anorthosite, norite, charnockite and mangerite. It has been suggested that the entire suite results from the fractional crystallization of a single parental magma. (Note: Some geologists of the first half of the 20th century regarded the rapakivi granites as "granitized" Jotnian sediments, an idea which is now discredited.)

== Geochemistry ==
Rapakivi is enriched in K, Rb, Pb, Nb, Ta, Zr, Hf, Zn, Ga, Sn, Th, U, F and rare earth elements, and poor in Ca, Mg, Al, P and Sr. Fe/Mg, K/Na and Rb/Sr ratios are high. SiO_{2} content is 70.5%, which makes rapakivi an acidic granite.

Rapakivi is high in fluoride, ranging 0.04–1.53%, compared to other similar rocks at around 0.35%. Consequently, groundwater in rapakivi zones is high in fluoride (1–2 mg/L), making the water naturally fluoridated. Some water companies actually have to remove fluoride from the water.

The uranium content of rapakivi is fairly high, up to 24 ppm. Thus, in rapakivi zones, the hazard from radon, a decay product of uranium, is elevated. Some indoor spaces surpass the 400 Bq/m^{3} safety limit.

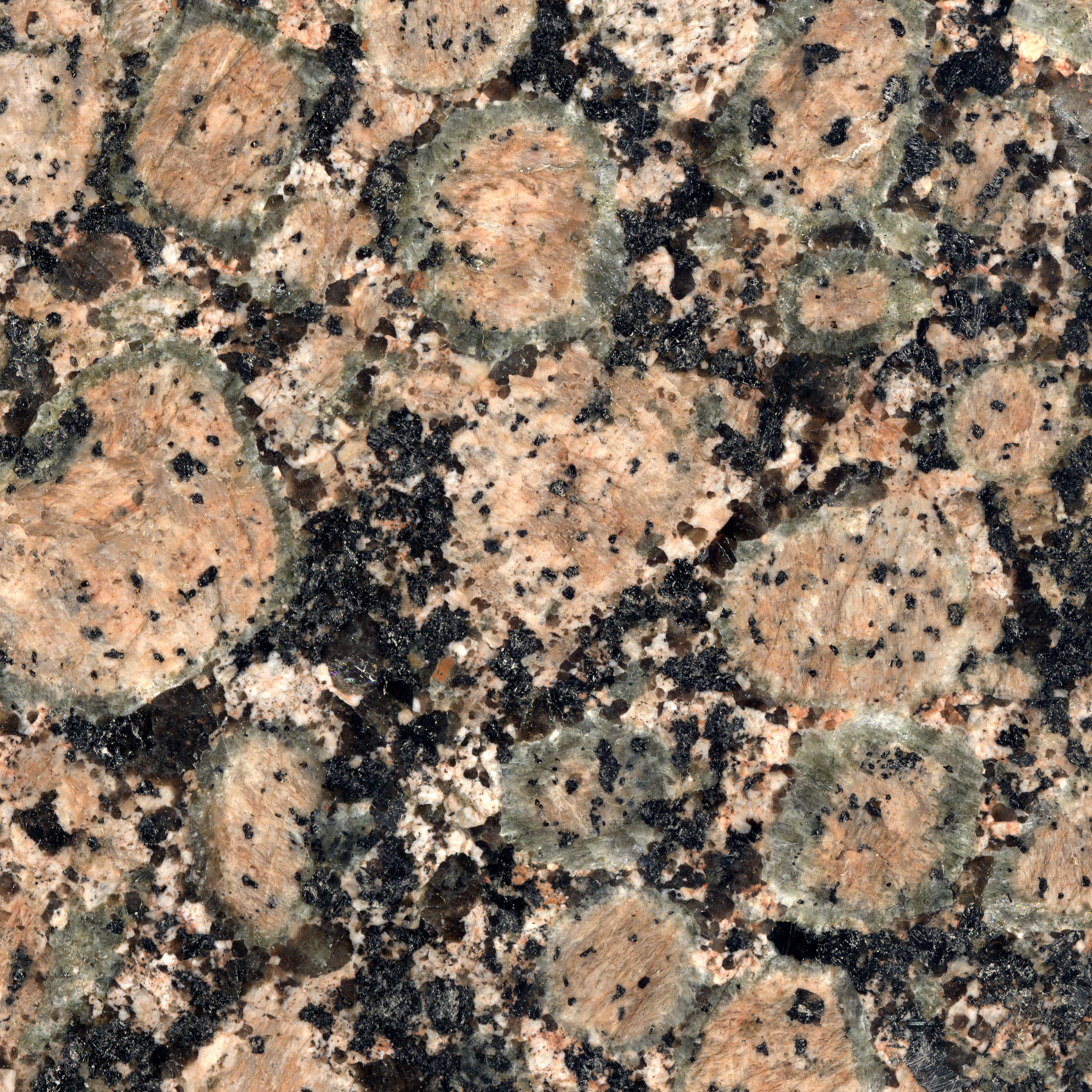
Rapakivi type wiborgite

== Petrography ==
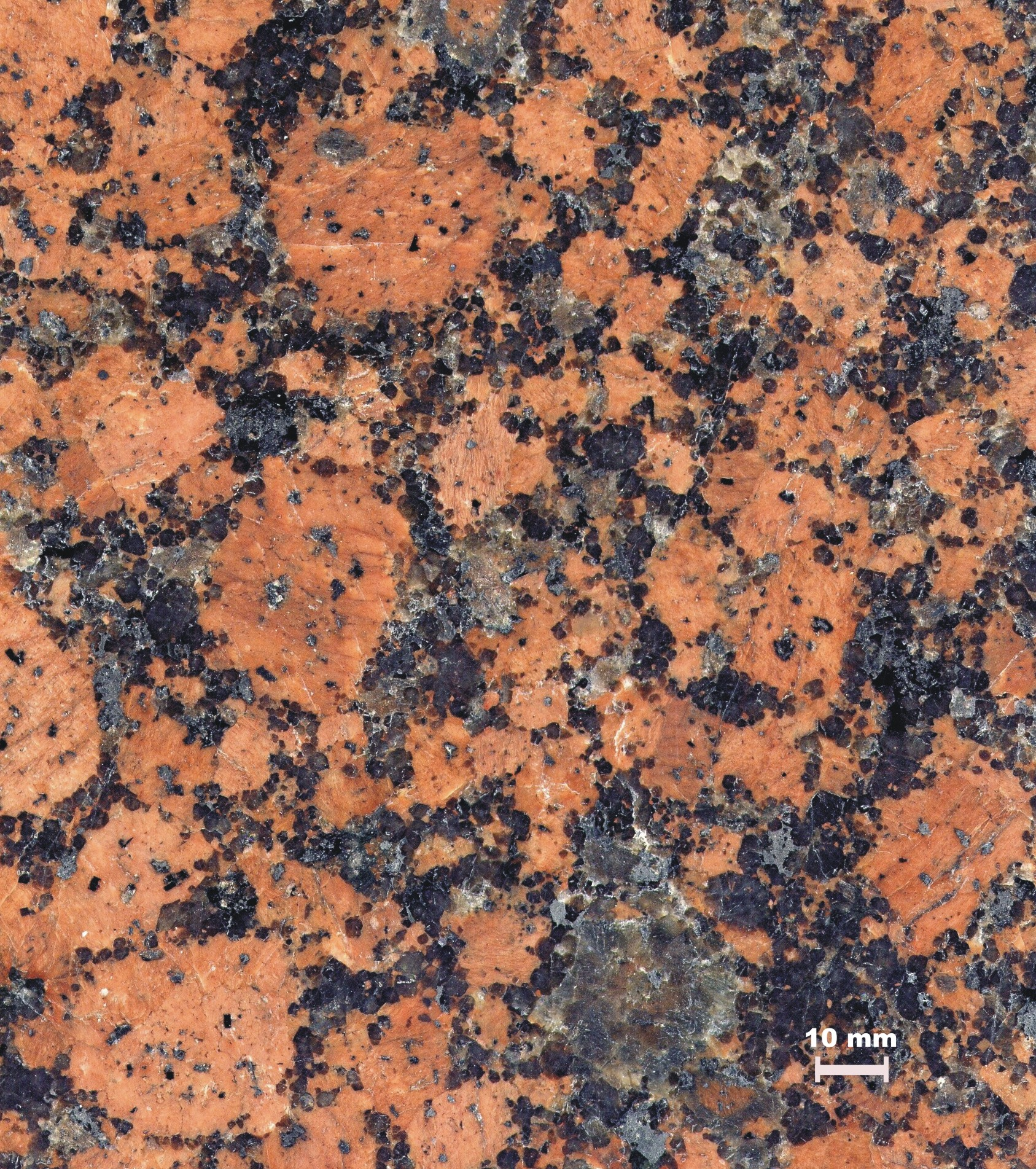
Rapakivi type pyterlite

Vorma (1976) states that rapakivi granites can be defined as:

- Orthoclase crystals have rounded shape
- Most (but not all) orthoclase crystals have plagioclase rims (wiborgite or viborgite type, named after the city of Vyborg)
- Orthoclase and quartz have crystallized in two phases, early quartz is in tear-drop shaped crystals (pyterlite type, named after the location of Pyterlahti).

A more recent definition by Haapala & Rämö is: Rapakivi granites are A-type granites that, at least in the larger batholiths, have rapakivi texture.

== Use as a building material ==
Rapakivi is the material used in Åland's mediaeval stone churches. In 1770, a rapakivi granite monolith boulder, the "Thunder Stone", was used as the pedestal for the Bronze Horseman statue in Saint Petersburg, Russia. Weighing 1,250 tonnes, this boulder is claimed to be the largest stone ever moved by humans. Modern building uses of rapakivi granites are in polished slabs used for covering buildings, floors, counter tops or pavements. As a building material, rapakivi granite of the wiborgite type is also known as "Baltic Brown".

== See also ==
- Orbicular granite
