= Arequipa-Antofalla =

South American geology

Arequipa-Antofalla is a basement unit underlying the central Andes in northwestern Argentina, western Bolivia, northern Chile and southern Peru. Geologically, it corresponds to a craton, terrane or block of continental crust. Arequipa-Antofalla collided and amalgamated with the Amazonian craton about 1000 million years ago during the Sunsás orogeny. As a terrane, Arequipa-Antofalla was ribbon-shaped during the Paleozoic, a time when it was bounded in the west by the Iapetus Ocean and in the east by the Puncoviscana Ocean.
