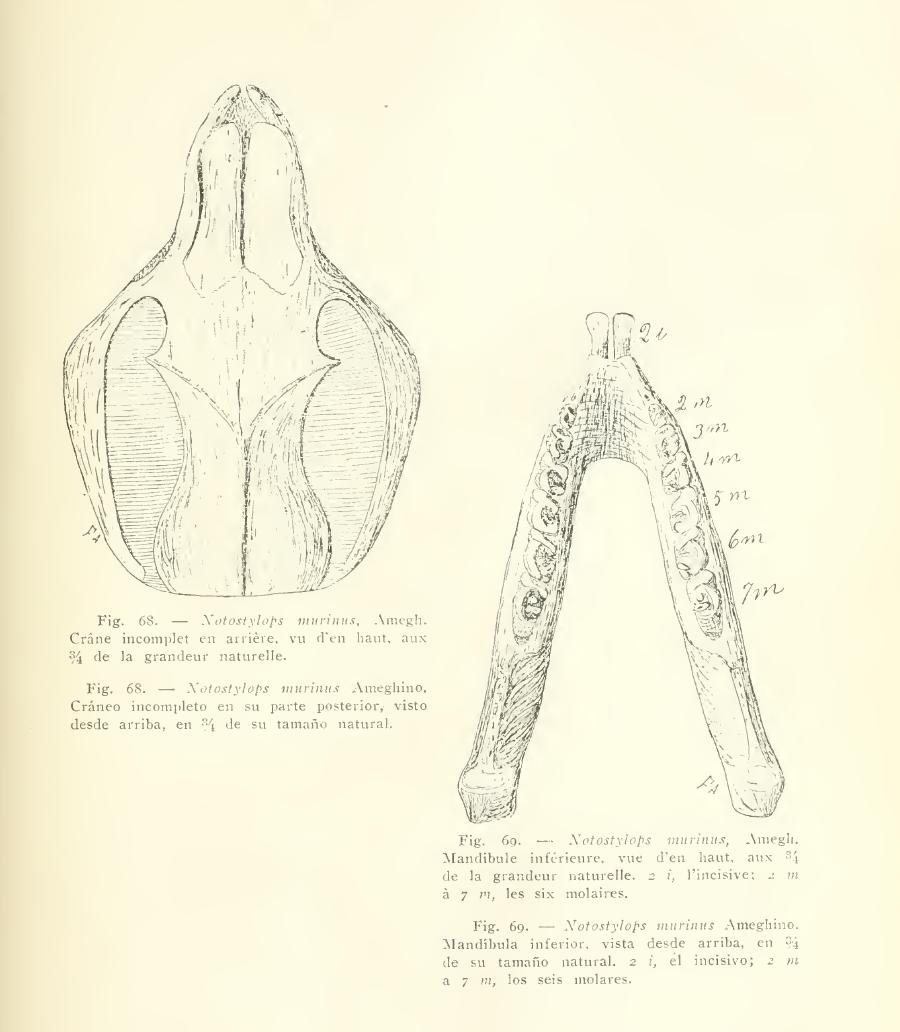
- Notostylops

Scientific classification
- Kingdom: Animalia
- Phylum: Chordata
- Class: Mammalia
- Order: †Notoungulata
- Family: †Notostylopidae
- Genus: †Notostylops; Ameghino, 1897

Species
- N. murinus (type species) Ameghino, 1897; N. appressus (Ameghino, 1902); N. pendens (Ameghino, 1901); N. pigafettai Simpson, 1948

Synonyms
- Anastylops Ameghino, 1897; Catastylops Ameghino, 1901; Entelostylops Ameghino, 1901; Eostylops Ameghino, 1901; Isostylops Ameghino, 1902; Pliostylops Ameghino, 1901

= Notostylops =

Notostylops Temporal range: Early-Late Eocene (Casamayoran-Divisaderan) ~48.6–37.2 Ma

Extinct genus of mammals

Notostylops ("south pillar face") is a genus of extinct South American notoungulates from Eocene Argentina. Fossils of the genus have been found in the Sarmiento, Casamayor, Andesitas Huancache and Koluel Kaike Formations.

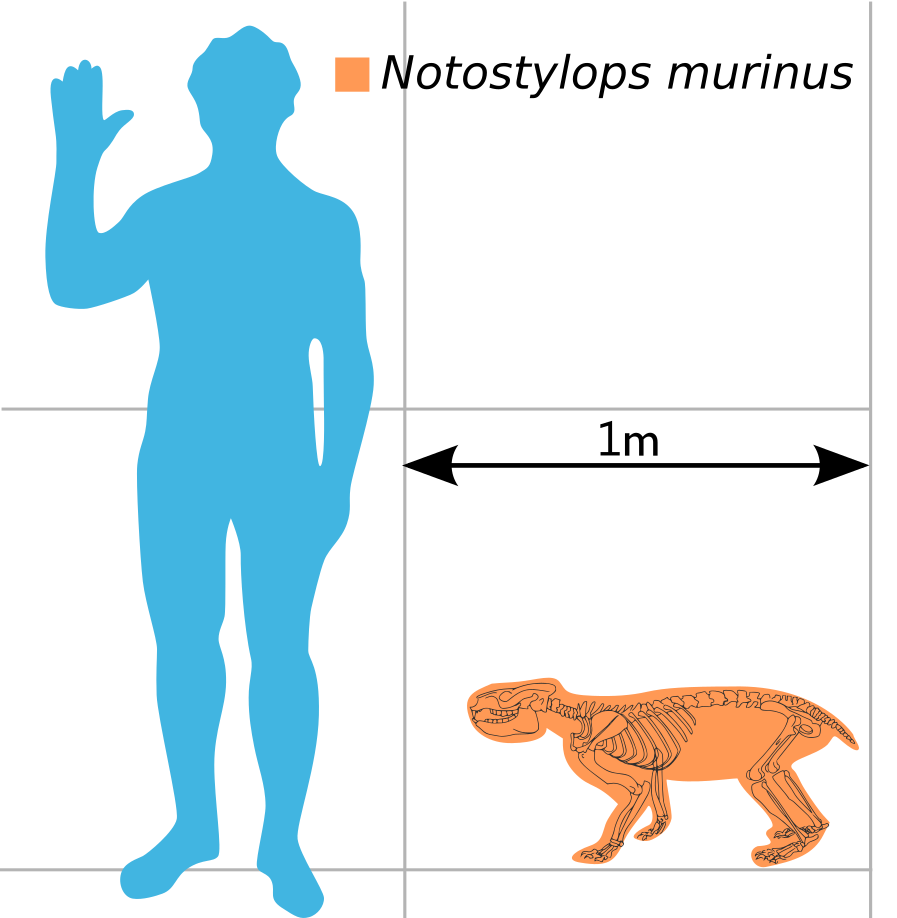
Size comparison of Notostylops murinus with a human.

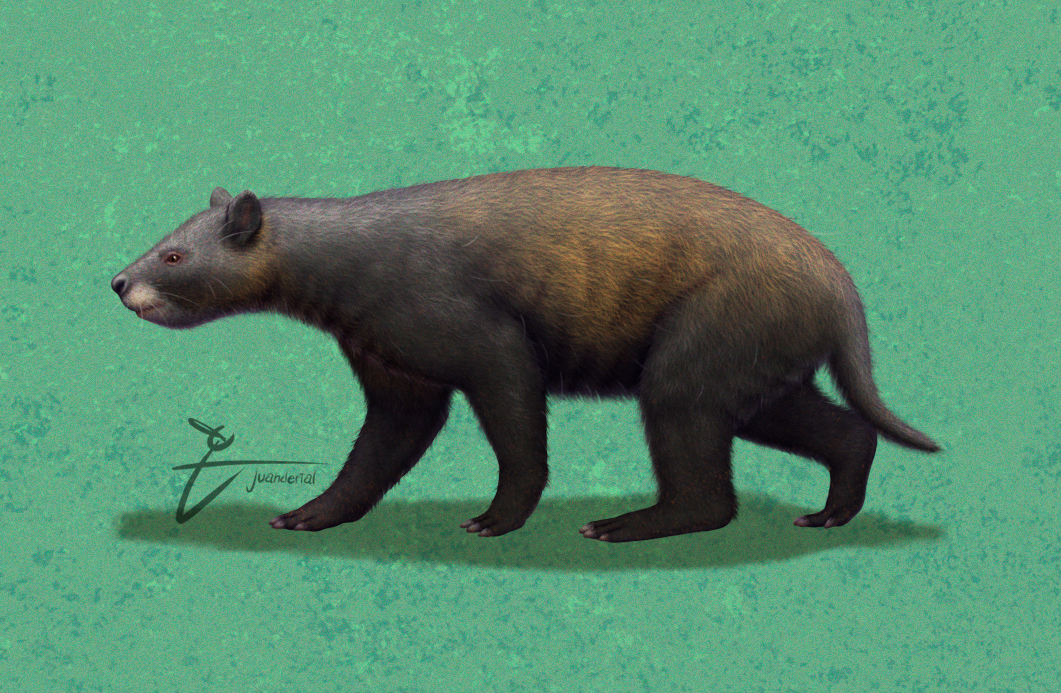
Life reconstruction.

== Description ==
Notostylops would have borne a superficial resemblance to a marmot or a wombat. The tall skull of Notostylops housed rodent-like incisor teeth. Notostylops incisors lacked complex, decussating enamel prisms, instead possessing radial enamel. The endocast of N. murinus had a volume of 9,807 mm^{3}, with the volume of the olfactory bulbs being 629 mm^{3}. Notostylops had a degree of cranial flexure of 34˚. Notostylops was about 75 centimetres (30 in) long.

== Palaeobiology ==
=== Locomotion ===
Notostylops was a highly generalised animal with regards to its locomotory pattern, very similar to the first eutherians and archaic, generalist ungulates. It was likely terrestrial and semifossorial, and its postcranial anatomy indicates that it would have had a broad repertoire of locomotory movements. Biomechanical analysis suggests that Notostylops was digitigrade and would have been able to run at speeds of up to 50 km/h. Additionally, it was secondarily scansorial and would have had some ability to climb trees.
