= Río de la Plata Craton =

Medium-sized continental block in Uruguay, eastern Argentina and southern Brazil

Atlantica at about 2.0 Ga. Archaean cratons in grey. Modern continents added for orientation.

Approximate location of Mesoproterozoic (older than 1.3 Ga) cratons in South America and Africa.

The Rio de la Plata Craton (RPC) is a medium-sized continental block found in Uruguay, eastern Argentina and southern Brazil. During its complex and protracted history it interacted with a series other blocks and is therefore considered important for the understanding of the amalgamation of West Gondwana. Two orogenic cycles have been identified in the RPC: a 2000 Ma-old western domain representing the old craton and a 700–500 Ma-old eastern domain assigned to the Brasiliano Cycle. It is one of the five cratons (ancient nuclei) of the South American continent. The other four cratons are: Amazonia, São Francisco, Río Apa and Arequipa–Antofalla.

== Geology ==
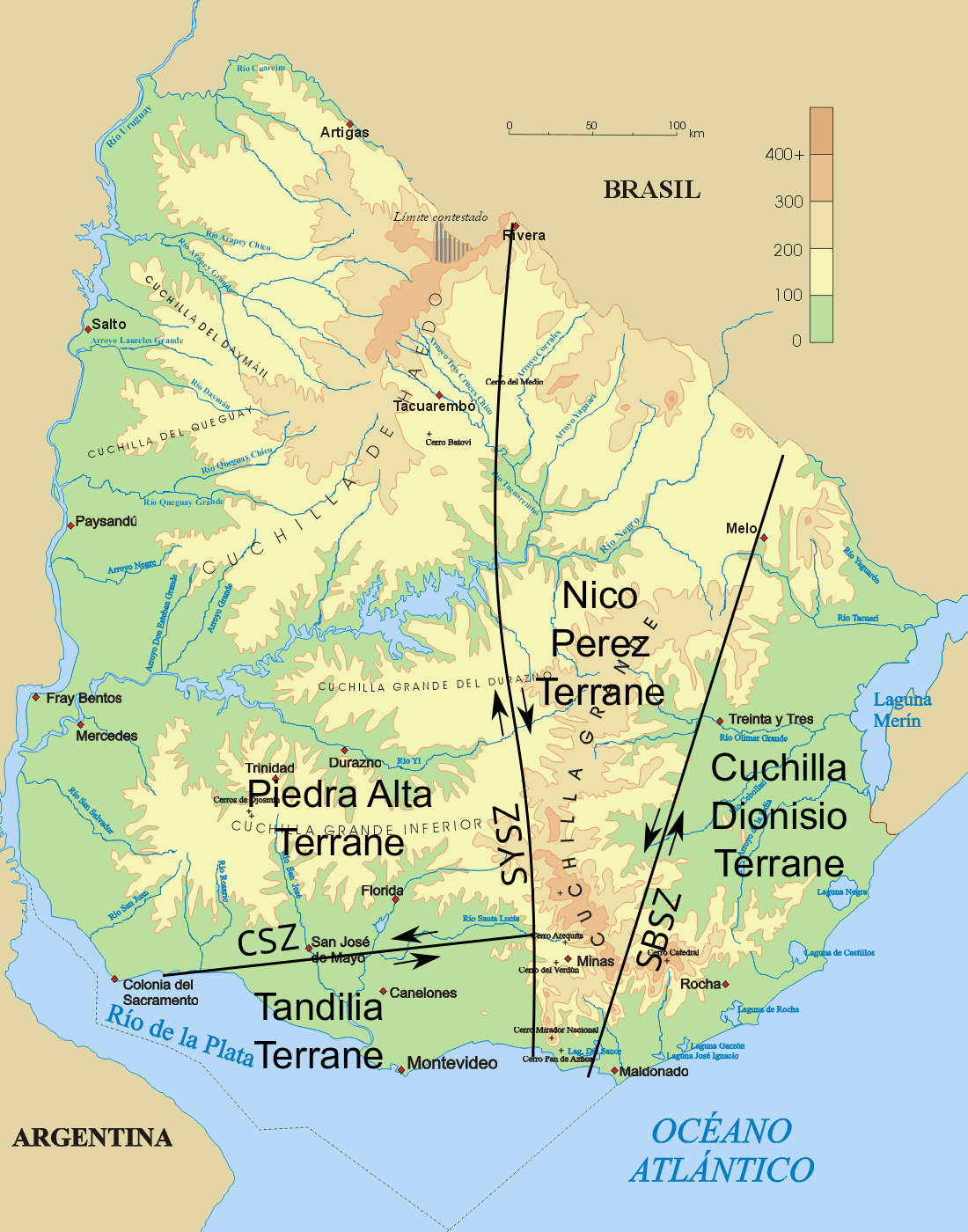
Shear zones and terranes in Uruguay after Gaucher et al. 2008, Fig. 1

Three shear zones divides the Precambrian basement of Uruguay and southern Brazil into four terranes.

Along the Uruguayan east coast (reaching into Brazil) is the Cuchilla Dionisio Terrane, an allochthonous African block juxtaposed to the RPC along the Sierra Ballena Shear Zone (SBSZ).

West of Cuchilla Dionisio, the Nico Pérez Terrane is delimited by two longitudinal shear zones: the SBSZ and the Late Mesoporterozoic Sarandí del Yí Shear Zone (SYSZ). In the Nico Pérez Terrane Archean-Paleoproterozoic-aged metamorphic and granitoid rocks as well as Neoproterzoic sedimentary successions crop out. The Neoproterzoic sedimentary successions probably deposited on an Atlantic-style continental shelf. The terrane hosts a swarm of NEE-SSW oriented dykes that date to the Neoproterozoic. It has however not been established to which degree Nico Pérez Terrane belongs to –or has affinity with– the Río de la Plata Craton.

East of the SYSZ, the latitudinal Colonia Shear Zone (CSZ) separates the Palaeoproterozoic (2000±100 Ma) Piedra Alta Terrane to the north from the Tandilia Terrane to the south. A period of extensional tectonics in the Late Paleoproterozoic coincided with the formation and intrusion of the Piedra Alta mafic dike swarm and the rapakivi granites of Illescas Batholith. The 1790±5 Ma-old Late Palaeoproterozoic Piedra Alta mafic dike swarm was subsequently affected by the 8 km (5.0 mi)-wide Mesoproterozoic SYSZ and its eastern end bends along the dextral megashear zone.

== Tectonic evolution ==
Today, the Río de la Plata Craton crops out in southern Uruguay and parts of Buenos Aires Province, Argentina. Crystalline rocks of the Río de la Plata Craton are dated between 2200 and 1700 million years ago, such as rocks in Uruguay which are dated at 1790 ±5 Ma. Dikes trending east-northeast in the same area are dated by argon-argon dating at 1727 ±10 Ma. The craton has a size of about 20,000 square kilometres (7,700 sq mi).

West Gondwana was assembled along the Transbrasiliano lineament in the Mid-Cambrian as, on one side, Amazonia, Río Apa, and some minor blocks collided with, on the other side, São Francisco/Congo, Río de la Plata, and some minor blocks. South of this lineament, along the western margin of the Río de la Plata Craton, the 535-520 Ma-old Pampean orogeny is partly made of an exotic terrane that was accreted to Gondwana's proto-Pacific margin (i.e. before the Andes had formed.)

The Adamastor Ocean, a "proto-Atlantic" ocean that opened with the break-up of the Rodinia supercontinent 780-750 Ma, separated the Río de la Plata Craton from the Congo Craton. The inversion of the Adamastor Ocean began 640 Ma with the development of a large back-arc basin along the western margin of the Kalahari Craton and the ocean closed when Río de la Plata collided with Kalahari about 545 Ma along the sinistral Sierra Ballena Shear Zone. The São Francisco and Río de la Plata cratons amalgamated 630–620 Ma, closing the Adamastor Ocean on the South American side and forming the Mantiqueira Mountains around 600 Ma.
