= Puncoviscana Formation =

Geologic formation in South America

- Stratigraphic range: Ediacaran–Cambrian; ~700–535 Ma
- Type: Formation
- Underlies: Mesón Group

Lithology
- Primary: Shale, sandstone, conglomerate, limestone, slate, schist

Location
- Location: Between Río de la Plata-Pampia Craton & Arequipa Massif
- Coordinates: 24.0°S 64.0°W
- Region: Catamarca, Jujuy, La Rioja, Salta & Tucumán Provinces; Tarija Department
- Country: Argentina, Bolivia
- Extent: Cordillera Oriental

Type section
- Named for: Puncoviscana
- Named by: Turner
- Year defined: 1960
- Puncoviscana Formation (Argentina)

Puncoviscana Formation (Spanish: Formación Puncoviscana) is a formation of sedimentary and metasedimentary rocks Late Ediacaran and Lower Cambrian age, estimated at between 700 and 535 Ma, that crop out in the Argentine Northwest. Most of the formation lies in Jujuy, Salta and Tucumán Province albeit some authors extend the formation further south to the Sierras Pampeanas near Córdoba.

There are various tectonic interpretations on the origin and type of sedimentary basin that accumulated Puncoviscana Formations sediments. An early interpretation was that the sediments originated from a passive marginal basin of the ancient continent Gondwana. Others suggested an intra-cratonic rift or aulacogen basin between Río de la Plata-Pampia Craton and Arequipa Massif. Yet other hypotheses revolve around the idea that the Puncoviscana Formation is related to a terrane called Pampia that accreted to Gondwana causing the closure of a sea in the way.

== Stratigraphy, lithology and fossils ==
The formation includes rocks such as shales, sandstones, conglomerates, limestones, slates and schists. Stratigraphically, the upper boundary of the Puncoviscana Formation is the Tilcarian unconformity, which is overlain by Cambrian and Ordovician sedimentary rocks of the Mesón Group that extend across the Argentine Northwest and Bolivia.

=== Fossil content ===
Among the fossils found in the formation are:

- Archaeonassa fossulata
- Asaphoidichnus isp.
- Beltanelloides
- Paliela
- Selkirkia

Ichnofossils

- Diplichnites isp.
- Helminthopsis abeli
- Helminthopsis tenuis
- Planolites

== Tectonic interpretations of the Puncoviscana Basin ==
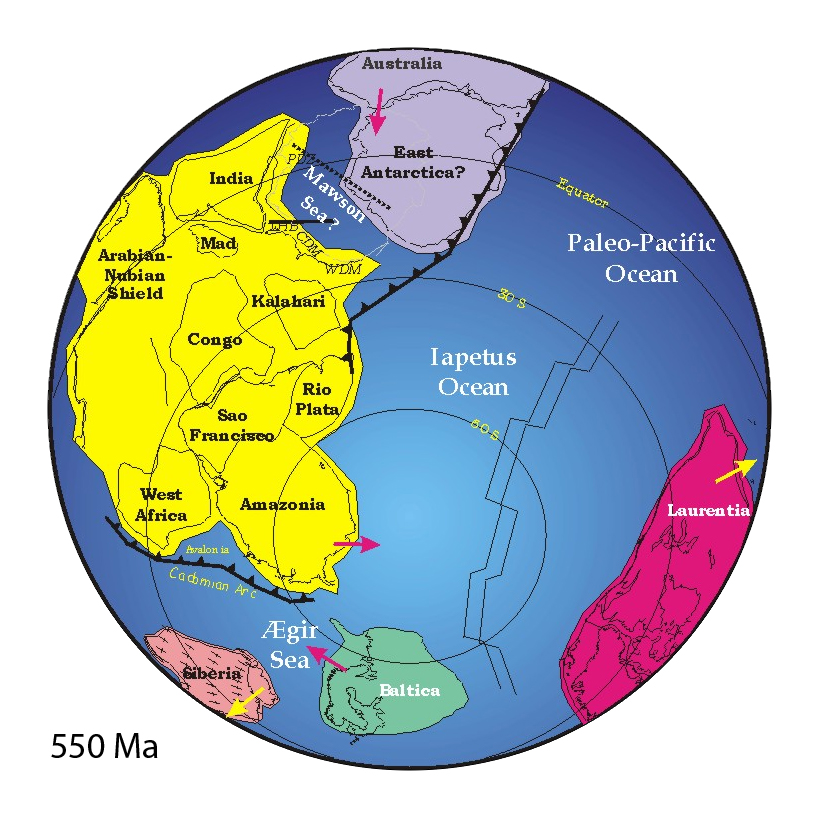
Paleogeographic reconstruction of Gondwana (in yellow) during the time of the Pampean orogeny, around 550 Ma

The Puncoviscana Basin was the sedimentary basin where the sediments of the Puncosviscana Formation were deposited. There have been differing views among geologists on the tectonic and paleogeographic position of the Puncoviscana Basin in relation to the events of the Pampean orogeny.

The Pampean orogeny is believed by some geologists to be associated with the accretion of a Pampia Terrane to the Río de la Plata Craton, causing in the way the closure of a sea that existed in-between. This closed seabed would have contained the sediments of the Puncoviscana Basin. Víctor Ramos proposes instead that the Puncoviscana Basin was a foreland basin located west of a "Pampia block" that collided with Río de la Plata Craton. Contrasting to this view, Aceñolaza and Toselli contend instead that the Puncuviscana Basin originated from an aulacogen splitting the Arequipa-Antofalla Craton from the Río de la Plata and Guaporé cratons. Following this interpretation the aulacogen would have closed during the Pampean orogeny.

A 2011 study argues that the Puncoviscana Formation deposited in either a forearc basin or a trench-slope basin associated with a volcanic arc in the western margin of Gondwana. The same study suggest that a Puncoviscana Ocean formed in the Neoproterozoic as the Arequipa-Antofalla terrane drifted away from the Amazonian continent. The opening of the Puncoviscana Ocean probably preceded the opening of the Iapetus Ocean with the Iapetus Ocean being separated from the Puncoviscana Ocean by the Arequipa-Antofalla terrane. By the time of the opening of Iapetus Ocean Puncoviscana ocean was likely being closed.

== See also ==
- Nama Group
