= Sierra Ballena Shear Zone =

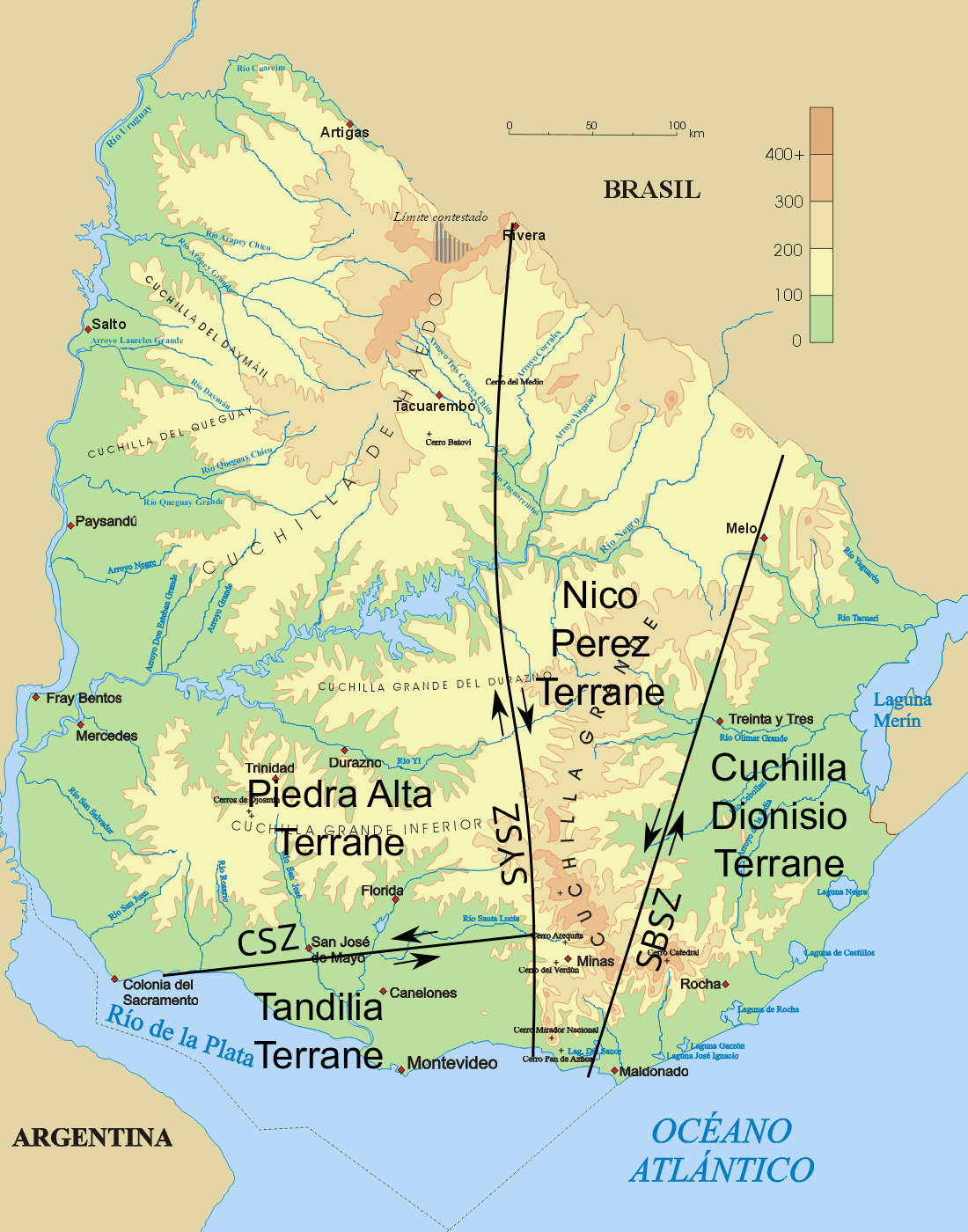
Shear zones and terranes in Uruguay after Gaucher et al.., 2008. Sierra Ballena Shear Zone is marked as "SBSZ". To the west Sarandí del Yí Shear Zone is marked as "SYSZ".

Sierra Ballena Shear Zone or SBSZ is a sinistral strike-slip shear zone running across the Uruguayan Shield in eastern Uruguay and the Brazilian state of Rio Grande do Sul. The system was last active in the Precambrian.
