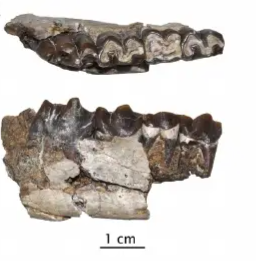
- Left dentary fragment of Paramacrauchenia scamnata

Scientific classification
- Kingdom: Animalia
- Phylum: Chordata
- Class: Mammalia
- Order: †Litopterna
- Family: †Proterotheriidae
- Subfamily: †Proterotheriinae
- Genus: †Paramacrauchenia; Bordas, 1939

Type species
- †Paramacrauchenia scamnata (Ameghino, 1902)

Other species
- †P. inexspectata Soria, 2001

= Paramacrauchenia =

Paramacrauchenia Temporal range: Early Miocene (Colhuehuapian-Santacrucian) ~21–17.8 Ma

Extinct genus of litopterns

Paramacrauchenia is an extinct genus of proterotheriid litopterns from the Early Miocene of what is now Argentina and Chile. Its fossils have been found in the Sarmiento and Santa Cruz Formations of Argentina and Chile.

== Taxonomy ==
Paramacrauchenia was originally assigned to the family Macraucheniidae, however, recent studies now consider it a member of the family Proterotheriidae, where it is found to be a derived member, closely related to Lambdaconus.

Below is a phylogenetic tree of the Proterotheriidae, based on the work of McGrath et al. 2020.

- Proterotheriidae
  - - Megadolodinae
      - Megadolodus
      - Bounodus
  - - - Indaleciidae
        - Indalecia
        - Adiantoides
    - - Paramacrauchenia
      - - Anisolambda
        - - Lambdaconus suinus
          - Lambdaconus inaequifacies
        - - Lambdaconus lacerum
          - - Paranisolambda
            - - Picturotherium
              - - - Neodolodus
                  - Protheosodon
                - - Anisolophus floweri
                  - - - Anisolophus australis
                      - - Anisolophus minusculus
                        - Prolicaphrium
                    - - - Olisanophus
                        - - Mesolicaphrium
                          - Diplasiotherium
                      - - Villarroelia
                        - - Tetramerorhinus fleaglei
                          - - Tetramerorhinus prosistens
                            - - - Tetramerorhinus cingulatum
                                - - Tetramerorhinus lucarius
                                  - Tetramerorhinus mixtum
                              - - - Diadiaphorus
                                  - Thoatherium
                                - - - Brachytherium
                                    - - Thoatheriopsis
                                      - - Proterotherium
                                        - Neobrachytherium ameghinoi
                                  - - Eoauchenia
                                    - Neobrachytherium ullumense
                                    - - Neobrachytherium morenoi
                                      - Neobrachytherium intermedium
                                    - - Neolicaphrium
                                      - - Epitherium
                                        - Uruguayodon
