= Uruguayodon =

Uruguayodon Temporal range: Pleistocene

Scientific classification
- Kingdom: Animalia
- Phylum: Chordata
- Class: Mammalia
- Order: †Litopterna
- Family: †Proterotheriidae
- Genus: †Uruguayodon; Corona et al., 2019
- Species: †U. alius

Binomial name
- †Uruguayodon alius Corona et al., 2019

Extinct genus of litopterns

Uruguayodon is an extinct genus of proterotheriid from the middle Pleistocene of Uruguay. It is known from the type and only species U. alius, named by Corona and colleagues in 2019 for dentaries and a partial postcrania from the Raigón Formation. Uruguayodon represents one of the latest occurrences of Proterotheriidae, with only Neolicaphrium representing other remains from the Pleistocene to possibly Holocene.

== Description ==
This animal would have been very similar to other proterotheriids, such as Anisolophus or Diadiaphorus. Uruguayodon possessed slender and elongated legs, equipped with three toes (the middle one of which was well developed). The skull was equipped with a rather short and high snout, with fairly elongated nasal bones. The molar had closely spaced internal tubercles but, in contrast to Anisolophus, the last lower molar was characterized by paraconid and paralophid in a lingually peripheral position; the metaflexis was smooth and there was no entoflexis.

== Classification ==
Uruguayodon was described in 2019, based on fossil remains found in Uruguay, in the San José member of the Raigón Formation. Another mammal has been found in the formation, Charruatoxodon, a toxodontid notoungulate described in 2022. The fossils of Uruguayodon had previously been ascribed to the genus Anisolophus, but a redescription allowed them to be attributed to a new genus and species. Uruguayodon is a derived member of the Proterotheriidae, a group of litoptern mammals, which during the Cenozoic developed evolutionary convergence with the equids, particularly with regards to their legs. Uruguayodon is the second known proterotheriid known from the Pleistocene, after Neolicaphrium.

Below is a phylogenetic tree of the Proterotheriidae, based on the work of McGrath et al. 2020, showing the position of Uruguayodon.

- Proterotheriidae
  - - Megadolodinae
      - Megadolodus
      - Bounodus
  - - - Indaleciidae
        - Indalecia
        - Adiantoides
    - - Paramacrauchenia
      - - Anisolambda
        - - Lambdaconus suinus
          - Lambdaconus inaequifacies
        - - Lambdaconus lacerum
          - - Paranisolambda
            - - Picturotherium
              - - - Neodolodus
                  - Protheosodon
                - - Anisolophus floweri
                  - - - Anisolophus australis
                      - - Anisolophus minusculus
                        - Prolicaphrium
                    - - - Olisanophus
                        - - Mesolicaphrium
                          - Diplasiotherium
                      - - Villarroelia
                        - - Tetramerorhinus fleaglei
                          - - Tetramerorhinus prosistens
                            - - - Tetramerorhinus cingulatum
                                - - Tetramerorhinus lucarius
                                  - Tetramerorhinus mixtum
                              - - - Diadiaphorus
                                  - Thoatherium
                                - - - Brachytherium
                                    - - Thoatheriopsis
                                      - - Proterotherium
                                        - Neobrachytherium ameghinoi
                                  - - Eoauchenia
                                    - Neobrachytherium ullumense
                                    - - Neobrachytherium morenoi
                                      - Neobrachytherium intermedium
                                    - - Neolicaphrium
                                      - - Epitherium
                                        - Uruguayodon
