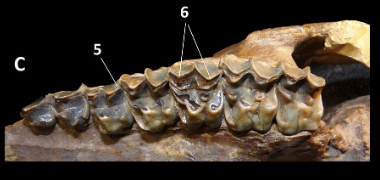
- Left lower jaw of Tetramerorhinus mixtum

Scientific classification
- Kingdom: Animalia
- Phylum: Chordata
- Class: Mammalia
- Order: †Litopterna
- Family: †Proterotheriidae
- Subfamily: †Proterotheriinae
- Genus: †Tetramerorhinus; Ameghino 1894

Type species
- †Tetramerorhinus fortis Ameghino, 1894

Species
- T. cingulatum Ameghino 1891; T. fleaglei Kramarz & Bond 2005; T. mixtum Ameghino 1894; T. lucarius Ameghino 1894; T. prosistens Ameghino 1899

Synonyms
- Genus synonymy: Tichodon Ameghino, 1894; T. cingulatum: Proterotherium cingulatum Ameghino, 1891; Tetramerorhinus fortis Ameghino, 1891; Licaphrium cavum Zittel, 1893; Proterotherium principale Ameghino, 1894; Tichodon quadrilobus Ameghino, 1894; T. lucarius: Diadiaphorus santaecrucis Lydekker, 1894; Licaphrium proclivum Ameghino, 1894; Proterotherium brachygnathum Ameghino, 1894; Proterotherium nitens Ameghino, 1894; Proterotherium perpolitum Ameghino, 1894; Proterotherium karaikense Ameghino, 1904; Proterotherium politum Ameghino, 1904; Proterotherium brachygnathus Scott, 1910; T. prosistens: Proterotherium prosistens Ameghino, 1899; Diadiaphorus zamius Ameghino, 1899; Heptaconus obcallatus Ameghino, 1899; T. mixtum: Proterotherium mixtum Ameghino, 1894; Proterotherium pyramidatum Ameghino, 1894; Proterotherium browni Scott, 1910; Proterotherium dodgei Scott, 1910

= Tetramerorhinus =

Tetramerorhinus Temporal range: Early Miocene-Middle Miocene (Colhuehuapian-Laventan) ~21–11.8 Ma

Extinct genus of litopterns

Tetramerorhinus is an extinct genus of proterotheriid litoptern that lived during the Early and Middle Miocene in what is now Argentina and Peru.

== Description ==
This animal resembled a small horse, with slender, elongated legs. The body was approximately a meter long, and it is supposed to have weighed between 30 and 50 kilograms. The skull had a relatively elongated snout, with nasal bones longer than Diadiaphorus and with less developed upper incisors. The orbits were positioned near the middle of the skull. The molars had lower crowns than those of more derived proterotheriids, such as Proterotherium.

The endocranial cast of a specimen of Tetramerorhinus lucarius has been preserved, which allowed to reconstruct certain structures of the animal's brain. The brain was quite large relatively to the size of the skull, due to the development, especially in the anterior part, of the neocortex, and to the complexity of the cerebellum. The olfactory lobes were small and separated by a deep notch, while the cerebellum was elongated and separated from the two cerebral hemispheres by a deep and narrow depression. The rhinencephalon was highly developed, and the piriform lobes were in a much less lateral position than those of archaic ungulates such as Phenacodus, and presented a sort of circular depression of unknown significance. Numerous longitudinal grooves covered the surface of the neocortex. The cranial nerves were unusually arranged relatively to those of other ungulates, and the foramen ovale was posterior to the tentorium osseum.

== Classification ==
The genus Tetramerorhinus was first described in 1894 by Florentino Ameghino, based on fossil remains found in Early Miocene deposits in Patagonia. Numerous species have been ascribed to this genus, such as Tetramerorhinus cingulatum, T. fleaglei, T. mixtum, T. lucarius, T. prosisttens.

Tetramerorhinus is a proterotheriid, a group of litopterns with characteristics similar to those of equids, although they were not closely related. Tetramerorhinus seems to have been a derived form, closely related to Anisolophus and Proterotherium.

Below is a phylogenetic tree of the Proterotheriidae, based on the work of McGrath et al. 2020.

- Proterotheriidae
  - - Megadolodinae
      - Megadolodus
      - Bounodus
  - - - Indaleciidae
        - Indalecia
        - Adiantoides
    - - Paramacrauchenia
      - - Anisolambda
        - - Lambdaconus suinus
          - Lambdaconus inaequifacies
        - - Lambdaconus lacerum
          - - Paranisolambda
            - - Picturotherium
              - - - Neodolodus
                  - Protheosodon
                - - Anisolophus floweri
                  - - - Anisolophus australis
                      - - Anisolophus minusculus
                        - Prolicaphrium
                    - - - Olisanophus
                        - - Mesolicaphrium
                          - Diplasiotherium
                      - - Villarroelia
                        - - Tetramerorhinus fleaglei
                          - - Tetramerorhinus prosistens
                            - - - Tetramerorhinus cingulatum
                                - - Tetramerorhinus lucarius
                                  - Tetramerorhinus mixtum
                              - - - Diadiaphorus
                                  - Thoatherium
                                - - - Brachytherium
                                    - - Thoatheriopsis
                                      - - Proterotherium
                                        - Neobrachytherium ameghinoi
                                  - - Eoauchenia
                                    - Neobrachytherium ullumense
                                    - - Neobrachytherium morenoi
                                      - Neobrachytherium intermedium
                                    - - Neolicaphrium
                                      - - Epitherium
                                        - Uruguayodon
