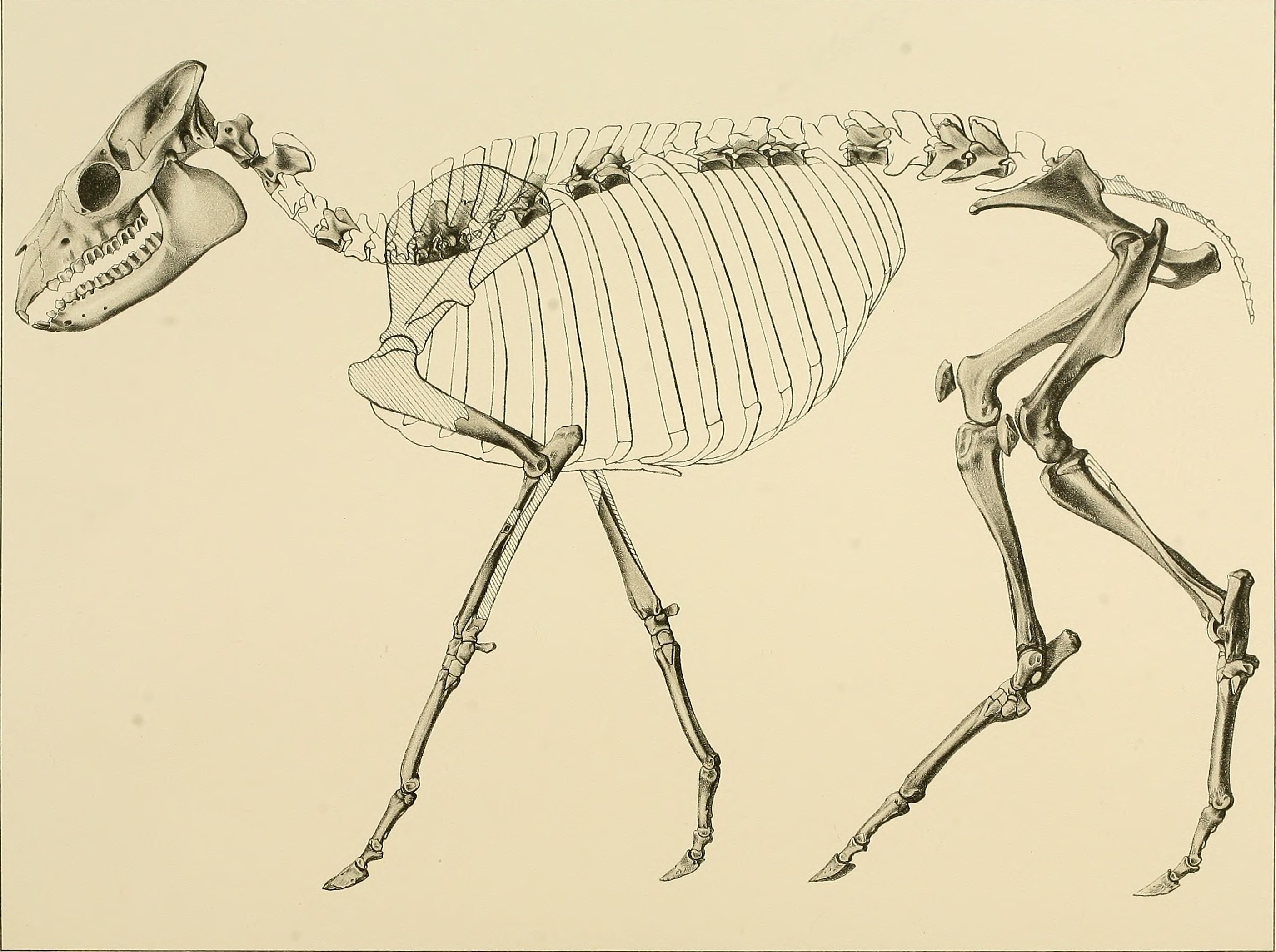
- 1901 T. minusculum skeletal illustration

Scientific classification
- Kingdom: Animalia
- Phylum: Chordata
- Class: Mammalia
- Infraclass: Placentalia
- Order: †Litopterna
- Family: †Proterotheriidae
- Subfamily: †Proterotheriinae
- Genus: †Thoatherium; Ameghino 1887

Type species
- †Thoatherium minusculum Ameghino, 1887

Species
- T. bilobatum Ameghino 1904; T. karaikense Ameghino 1904; T. minusculum Ameghino 1887; T. rhabdodon Ameghino 1894; T. velatum Ameghino 1904

Synonyms
- Genus synonymy: Oreomeryx Mercerat, 1891; Rhagodon Ameghino, 1891; Diaphragmodon Mercerat, 1893; T. minisculum: Proterotherium cavum Ameghino, 1887; Rhagodon gracilis Ameghino, 1891; Thoatherium crepidatum Ameghino, 1891; Anisolophus burmeisteri Mercerat, 1891; Oreomeryx proprius Mercerat, 1891; Oreomyx superbus Mercerat, 1891; Diaphragmodon cavum (Ameghino, 1887) Mercerat, 1893; Diaphragmodon burmeisteri (Mercerat, 1891) Mercerat, 1893

= Thoatherium =

Thoatherium Temporal range: Early Miocene (Santacrucian) ~17.5–16.3 Ma

Extinct genus of litopterns

Thoatherium (meaning "active swift-beast") is an extinct genus of litoptern mammals from the Early Miocene of Argentina. Fossils of the genus have been found in the Santa Cruz Formation in Argentina. With a length of 70 centimetres (2.3 ft), the gazelle-like Thoatherium was a small representative of the order Litopterna. Judging from its long legs, it was a fast runner. Thoatherium had remarkably reduced toes; only one horse-like hoof remained. Thoatherium even lacked splint bones, which are remnants of the second and fourth toe found in modern horses. Judging from its generalised, brachydont teeth, Thoatherium fed on soft leaves rather than on tough grasses.

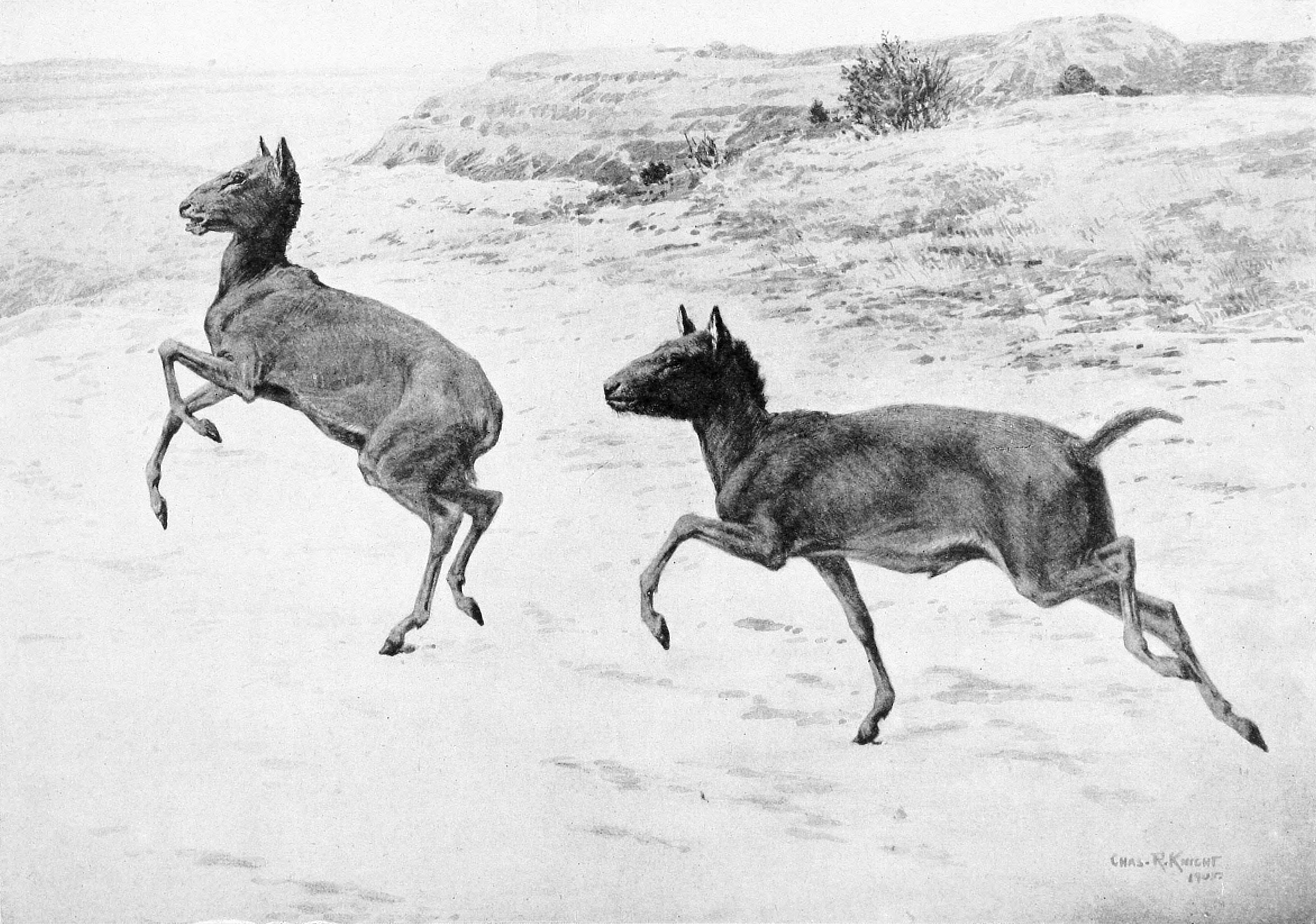
Life reconstruction by Charles R. Knight

== Taxonomy ==
Thoatherium is currently grouped within the family Proterotheriidae, a family of similarly hooved litoptern notoungulates. The closest relative of the genus is Diadiaphorus.

Phylogeny of Proterotheriidae, including Thoatherium, after McGrath et al. (2019) (Polyphyletic taxa in pink).

- Proterotheriidae
  - - Megadolodinae
      - Megadolodus
      - Bounodus
  - - - Indaleciidae
        - Indalecia
        - Adiantoides
    - - Paramacrauchenia
      - - Anisolambda
        - - Lambdaconus suinus
          - Lambdaconus inaequifacies
        - - Lambdaconus lacerum
          - - Paranisolambda
            - - Picturotherium
              - - - Neodolodus
                  - Protheosodon
                - - Anisolophus floweri
                  - - - Anisolophus australis
                      - - Anisolophus minusculus
                        - Prolicaphrium
                    - - - Olisanophus
                        - - Mesolicaphrium
                          - Diplasiotherium
                      - - Villarroelia
                        - - Tetramerorhinus fleaglei
                          - - Tetramerorhinus prosistens
                            - - - Tetramerorhinus cingulatum
                                - - Tetramerorhinus lucarius
                                  - Tetramerorhinus mixtum
                              - - - Diadiaphorus
                                  - Thoatherium
                                - - - Brachytherium
                                    - - Thoatheriopsis
                                      - - Proterotherium
                                        - Neobrachytherium ameghinoi
                                  - - Eoauchenia
                                    - Neobrachytherium ullumense
                                    - - Neobrachytherium morenoi
                                      - Neobrachytherium intermedium
                                    - - Neolicaphrium
                                      - - Epitherium
                                        - Uruguayodon

== Description ==
Thoatherium was similar in size to a small gazelle, and was generally smaller than other proterotheriid mammals. The monodactyly of Thoatherium is the most extreme than in any other animal, even moreso than modern Equus, for which Thoatherium is most notable. The genus is assumed to have weighed an average of 20 kg (44 lb).

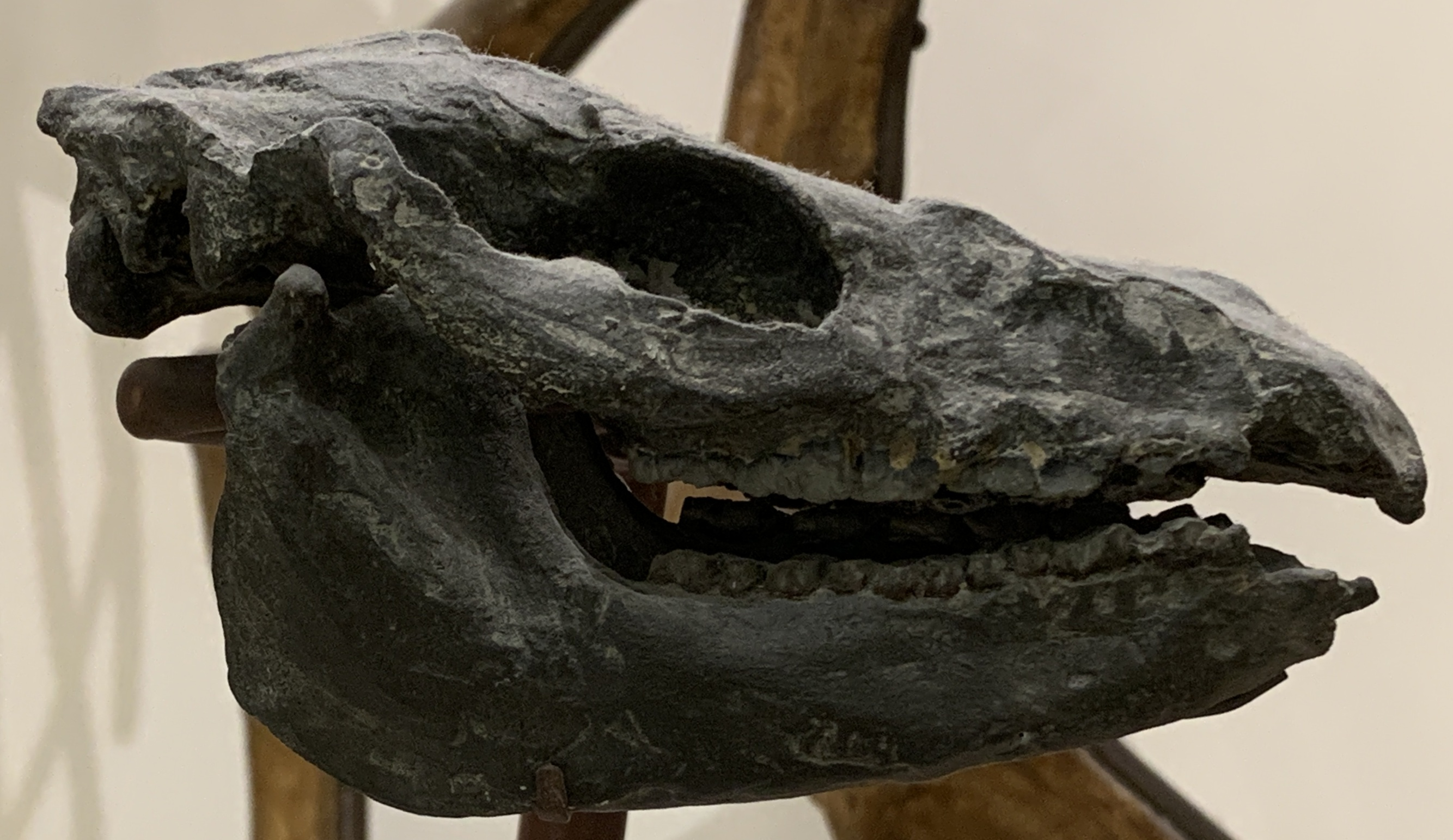
T. minusculum (=T. crepidatum) skull cast from the AMNH.

=== Skull ===
The skull of Thoatherium was slender and pointed, with the nasals being shortened. The mandibular symphysis of the genus is coosified, with the two rami being entirely fused.

==== Dentition ====
Unlike some earlier protherotheriids, the genus lacks tusks of any type. The incisors are uniform and chisel-like. The incisors are separated from the canines by a diastema 3 mm (0.12 in) in length. The canines themselves are small, measuring only 4 mm (0.16 in) in length. Beyond the canines there is a second, larger diastema after which lies the premolars. The first premolars are compressed, while the hind premolars are greatly enlarged. The molars have 4 roots, like the related genera Brachytherium and Proterotherium. The dental formula of the genus is 1.0.4.32.1.4.3 × 2 = 36.

=== Appendicular skeleton ===
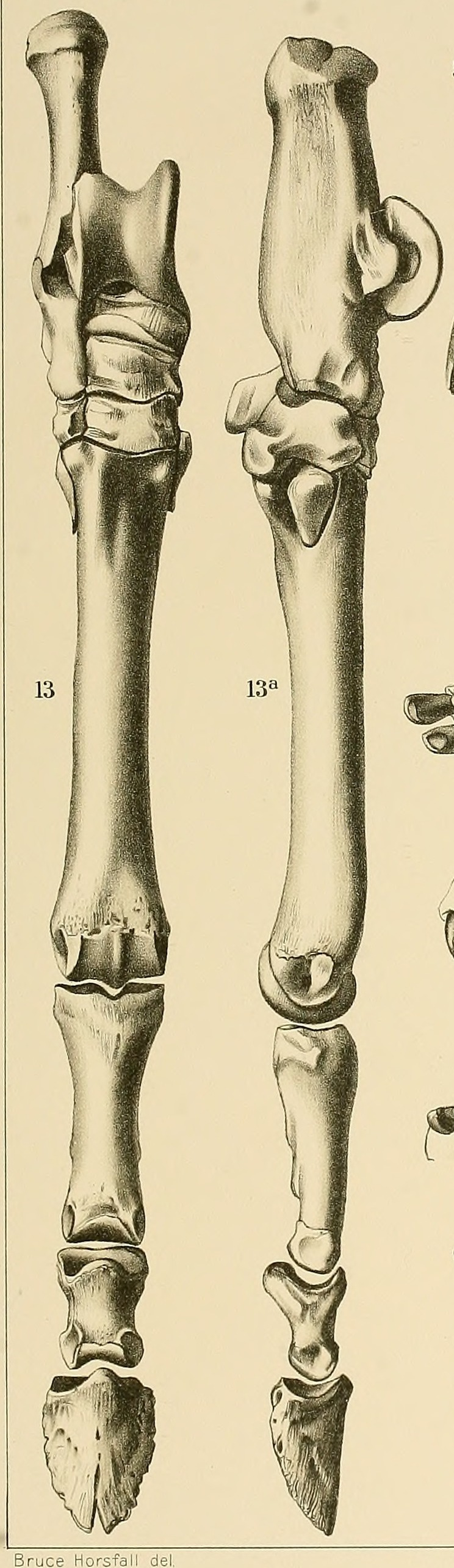
Right pes of Thoatherium

==== Feet ====
The single hoof on the foot of Thoatherium is derived from the third digit, and it is the only digit present, the rest being completely reduced. The splints that the modern genus Equus (an anatomical analogue) possesses are absent, with the remnants of these other digits forming small, scale like protuberances. The connection points within the carpals and tarsals are the same as in pentadactyl litopterns, which is unlike the condition in the monodactyl equids. William Berryman Scott, a paleontologist, refers to this as inadaptive reduction, based on Russian paleontologist Vladimir Kovalevsky's classification of digit reduction. Thoatherium lacks a medial tubercule on the astragalus.

== Paleoecology ==
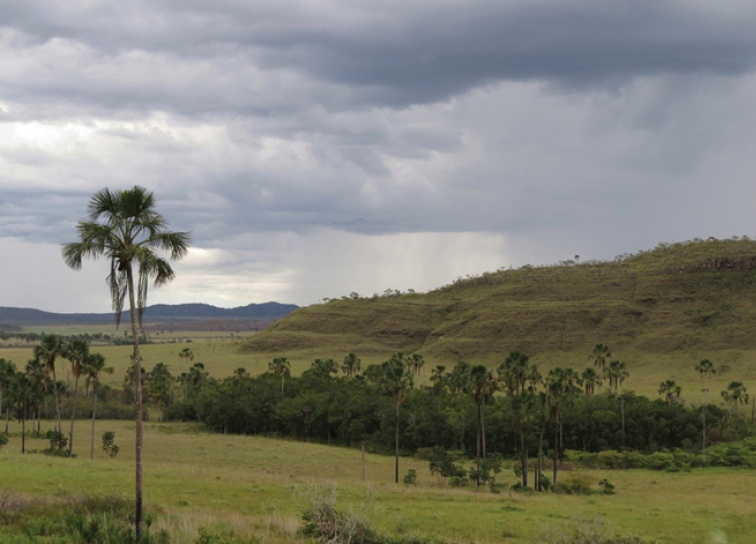
Modern day gallery forest in Cerrado, Brazil. This environment is similar to the paleoenvironment of the Santa Cruz Formation during the Miocene.

=== Paleoenvironment ===
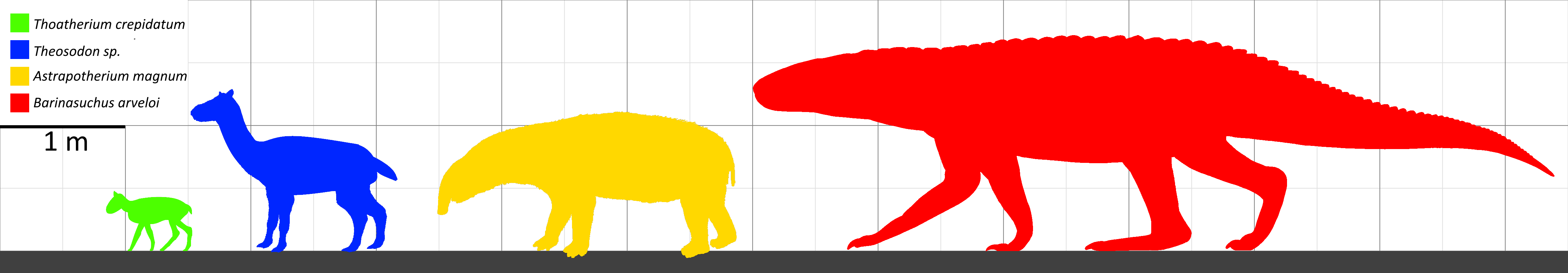
Thoatherium compared to other Miocene South American animals(from left to right); Theosodon, Astrapotherium and Barinasuchus.

Thoatherium was endemic to South America, with the genus living alongside many other endemic groups of ungulate mammals. Thoatherium best known from the Santa Cruz Formation of Patagonia, as well Ituzaingó Formation of Mesopotamia, the latter being a fluvio-deltaic depositional site. The genus lived alongside a great diversity of mammals, including other litopterns like Scalabrinitherium and Brachytherium, the typotheres Protypotherium and Eutypotherium, the toxodonts Palaeotoxodon and Dinotoxodon and many other native ungulates. The flora of the Ituzaingó Formation was equally diverse, with proteaceans, bamboo, sedges, palms and legumes all being known. The environment was likely a seasonally dry tropical rainforest. The Santa Cruz formation, while sharing much of the same fauna, was more open, being a mix of deciduous forest, gallery forest and savanna.

=== Paleobiology ===
Thoatherium, like other proterotheriids, is suggested to be a browser that specialized in mixed habitats due to the shape of their skull. The genus was gracile and was able to run fast, which helped them in the varied habitats they lived in. Thoatherium is thought to have had a diet of softer plants due to the lack of hypsodonty in their teeth.

=== Extinction ===
Historically, Thoatherium was considered among the last of the proterotheriids, and it was assumed that the entire group went extinct due to new carnivoran predators from North America. This was disputed by the discovery of a Holocene genus, Neolicaphrium, which lived alongside many northern ungulates. The decline of proterotheriids is suggested to be caused by rapid climate change which caused more arid environments to become more common, as opposed to wet, closed forests.
