= Proterotherium =

Proterotherium Temporal range: Late Miocene (Huayquerian) ~6.8 Ma

Scientific classification
- Kingdom: Animalia
- Phylum: Chordata
- Class: Mammalia
- Order: †Litopterna
- Family: †Proterotheriidae
- Subfamily: †Proterotheriinae
- Genus: †Proterotherium; Ameghino, 1883

Type species
- †Proterotherium cervioides Ameghino, 1883

Extinct genus of litopterns

Proterotherium (meaning "first beast") is an extinct genus of litoptern mammal of the family Proterotheriidae that lived during the Late Miocene of Argentina and Chile. Fossils of this genus have been found in the Ituzaingó Formation of Argentina, and the Galera Formation of Chile.

== Classification ==
The genus Proterotherium was first described by Florentino Ameghino in 1883, on the basis of fossil remains found in Upper Miocene deposits in Patagonia. The type species is Proterotherium cervioides. Numerous other species have been ascribed to this genus, many of which come from lower-middle Miocene deposits, such as P. americanum, P. australe, P. brachygnathum, P. cavum, P. cingulatum, P. curtidens, P. dichotomum, P. divortium, P. gradatum, P. intermedium, P. karaikense, P. mixtum, P. nitens, P. perpolitum, P. politum, P. main, and P. pyramidatum. However, many of these species are now considered to be synonymous with the type species, and others belong to other genera, such as Tetramerorhinus, a genus long confused with Proterotherium.

Proterotherium is the type genus of Proterotheriidae, a group of litopterns characterized by a morphology very similar to that of equids, especially in regards to the legs. Proterotherium is a typical example of the Miocene proterotheres, very specialized in the morphology of the legs and also in the dentition. A very similar animal was Anisolophus.

Cladogram based in the phylogenetic analysis published by McGrath et al., 2020, showing the position of Proterotherium:

- Proterotheriidae
  - - Megadolodus
    - Bounodus
  - - - Indalecia
      - Adiantoides
    - - Paramacrauchenia
      - - Anisolambda
        - - Lambdaconus suinus
          - Lambdaconus inaequifacies
        - - Lambdaconus lacerum
          - - Paranisolambda
            - - Picturotherium
              - - - Neodolodus
                  - Protheosodon
                - - Anisolophus floweri
                  - - - Anisolophus australis
                      - - Anisolophus minusculus
                        - Prolicaphrium specillatum
                    - - - Olisanophus
                        - - Mesolicaphrium
                          - Diplasiotherium
                      - - Villarroelia
                        - - Tetramerorhinus fleaglei
                          - - Tetramerorhinus prosistens
                            - - - Tetramerorhinus cingulatum
                                - - Tetramerorhinus lucarius
                                  - Tetramerorhinus mixtum
                              - - - Diadiaphorus
                                  - Thoatherium
                                - - - Brachytherium
                                    - - Thoatheriopsis
                                      - - Proterotherium
                                        - Neobrachytherium ameghinoi
                                  - - Eoauchenia
                                    - Neobrachytherium ullumense
                                    - - Neobrachytherium morenoi
                                      - Neobrachytherium intermedium
                                    - - Neolicaphrium
                                      - - Epitherium
                                        - Uruguayodon
