= Guilielmofloweria =

Guilielmofloweria Temporal range: Middle-Late Eocene (Mustersan-Divisaderan) ~48–37 Ma

Scientific classification
- Kingdom: Animalia
- Phylum: Chordata
- Class: Mammalia
- Order: †Litopterna
- Family: †Proterotheriidae
- Genus: †Guilielmofloweria; Ameghino 1901
- Species: †G. plicata

Binomial name
- †Guilielmofloweria plicata Ameghino 1901

Extinct genus of litopterns

Guilielmofloweria is an extinct genus of proterotheriid litoptern that lived from the Middle to Late Eocene of what is now Argentina. Fossils have been found in the Sarmiento Formation of Argentina.

== Taxonomy ==
Guilielmofloweria was first named in 1901 by Florentino Ameghino based on fragmentary remains found in the Sarmiento Formation of Argentina, in rocks dating back to the Middle Eocene. He originally considered it a member of the pantodont family Pantolambdidae, but recent studies have shown this to be incorrect, as Richard Cifelli considered it as a member of the litoptern family Proterotheriidae, more specifically within the subfamily Anisolambdinae. Anisolambdinae (also called Anisolambdidae in some studies) was proposed to unite the primitive and earlier forms Anisolambda, Eolicaphrium, Heteroglyphis, Lambdaconops, Paranisolambda, Protheosodon, Wainka and Xesmodon. However, the phylogenetic analysis of McGrath and colleagues recovered the included genera to neither form their own clade, or to universally represent basal taxa outside the genera of Proterotheriinae per Soria, making Anisolambdinae a polyphyletic group of unrelated organisms.
