= Monte Hermoso Formation =

Geological formation in Argentina

- Stratigraphic range: Tortonian (Huayquerian); ~5–4.3 Ma
- The Monte Hermoso beach
- Type: Geological formation
- Underlies: Puerto Belgrano Formation
- Overlies: Puerto Belgrano Formation; Punta Tejada Formation

Lithology
- Primary: Siltstone, sandstone
- Other: Conglomerate

Location
- Coordinates: 38.83°S 61.69°W
- Region: Buenos Aires
- Country: Argentina

Type section
- Named for: Monte Hermoso
- Named by: Carlos Zavala
- Monte Hermoso Formation (Argentina)

Monte Hermoso Formation is a geological formation of the Pliocene that crops out prominently at its type locality along the coastal cliffs of Farola Monte Hermoso, in Buenos Aires Province, Argentina. This formation is recognized as the foundational basis for establishing the Montehermosan stage/age of the South American Land Mammal Ages (SALMA).

== Paleofauna ==
=== Birds ===
Taxa	Species	Presence	Abundance	Description	Images	Notes
Chunga	C. incerta		A specimen consists of the distal end of a tibiotarsus.	An early seriema		
Dryornis	D. pampeanus			An Argentinian vulture		
Foetopterus	F. ambiguus			An early falcon		
Heterorhea	H. dabbenei					
Mesembriornis	M. milneedwardsi			A Phorusrhacid formally named Hermosiornis australis		
Protorhea	P. azarae			An early rhea		
Tinamisornis	T. intermedius			A tinamidae		
Tinamisornis	T. parvulus			A tinamidae		
Vultur	V. gryphus					

=== Mammals ===
==== Metatherians ====
Taxa	Species	Presence	Abundance	Description	Images	Notes
Notocynus	N. hermosicus			A borhyaenid		
Thylacosmilus	T. atrox			A thylacosmilid		
Parahyaenodon	P. argentinus			A borhyaenid		

==== Liptoterns ====
Taxa	Species	Presence	Abundance	Description	Images	Notes
Eoauchenia	E. primitiva			A proterotheriid		
Diplasiotherium	D. robustum			A proterotheriid		
Promacrauchenia	P. antiqua					

==== Rodents ====
Taxa	Species	Presence	Abundance	Description	Images	Notes
Actenomys	A. priscus					
Auliscomys	A. formosus					
Caviodon	C. australis					
Eumysops	E. laeviplicatus					
Necromys	N. bonapartei					
Paramyocastor	P. diligens					
Phugatherium	P. cataclisticum					
Pithanotomys	P. columnaris					

==== Cingulata ====
Taxa	Species	Presence	Abundance	Description	Images	Notes
Chorobates	C. rescens					
Chorobates	C. villosissimus					
Doellotatus	D. inornatus					
Eleutherocercus	E. antiquus					
Holozaedyus	H. laevisculptus					
Macrochorobates	M. chapalmalensis			A euphractine cingulate		
Plohophorus	P. figuratus					
