= Postorbital bar =

Bony arched structure in mammalian taxa

The postorbital bar (or postorbital bone) is a bony arched structure that connects the frontal bone of the skull to the zygomatic arch, which runs laterally around the eye socket. It is a trait that occurs in some mammalian taxa, such as most strepsirrhine primates and the hyrax, while haplorhine primates have evolved fully enclosed sockets. One theory for this evolutionary difference is the relative importance of vision to both orders. As haplorrhines (tarsiers and simians) tend to be diurnal, and rely heavily on visual input, many strepsirrhines are nocturnal and have a decreased reliance on visual input.

Postorbital bars evolved several times independently during mammalian evolution and the evolutionary histories of several other clades. Some species, such as tarsiers, have a postorbital septum. This septum can be considered as joined processes with a small articulation between the frontal bone, the zygomatic bone and the alisphenoid bone and is therefore different from the postorbital bar, while it forms a composite structure together with the postorbital bar. Other species such as dermopterans have postorbital processes, which is a more primitive incomplete stage of the postorbital bar.

== Function ==
In the past decades, many different hypotheses were made on the possible function of the postorbital bar. Three of them are commonly cited.

=== External trauma hypothesis ===
Prince and Simons offered the external trauma hypothesis, where the postorbital bar protects the orbital contents from external trauma. However, a few years later Cartmill showed otherwise. He was convinced that the postorbital bar was not adequate enough to offer protection against sharp objects such as the teeth of other species. He was therefore convinced that the postorbital bar must have a different function.

=== Mastication hypothesis ===
Greaves offered a new view on this bone and came up with the mastication hypothesis. Greaves suggests that the bar strengthens the relatively weak orbital area against torsional loading, imposed by bite force in species with large masseter and temporalis muscles. However the orientation of the postorbital process does not match the direction of the forces mentioned by Greaves.

=== Position hypothesis ===
Cartmill suggests that in small mammals with large eyes and relatively small temporal fossae, where the anterior temporal muscle and the temporalis fascia are pulled to a more lateral position with increasing orbital convergence (front-facing eyes), the tension caused by the contraction of these muscles would distort the orbital margins and disrupt oculomotor precision.

Heesy shows that the postorbital bar stiffens the lateral orbit. Without a stiffened lateral orbit, deformation would displace soft tissues, when contraction of the anterior temporalis muscle takes place, thus impeding eye movement.

== Occurrence ==
A complete postorbital bar has evolved at least eleven times as a convergent adaptation in nine mammalian orders. Postorbital bars are characteristic to the following clades:

- Order Primates
- Order Scandentia
- Order Perissodactyla
  - Subfamily Equinae
- Order Artiodactyla
  - Suborder Neoselenodontia

Postorbital bars have furthermore developed individually in the following taxa:

- Clade Metatheria
  - Order †Sparassodonta
    - †Thylacosmilus
  - Order Diprotodontia
    - †Thylacoleo
- Clade Eutheria
  - Order Carnivora
    - †Barbourofelis
  - Order †Litopterna
    - †Thoatherium
    - †Diadiaphorus
  - Order Sirenia
    - Trichechus senegalensis
  - Order Artiodactyla
    - Balaenoptera acutorostrata

The presence of a postorbital bar in the extinct Oviraptorosauria species Avimimus portentosus was one of several defining characteristics that suggested to paleontologists that the species was more morphologically different from avian species than previously thought, affecting interpretation of the rate of evolution from dinosaurs to birds.

== Postorbital process ==
Postorbital bars are likely derived from well-developed postorbital processes, an intermediate condition where a small gap retains between the process and the zygomatic arch. Well-developed postorbital processes have evolved separately within the orders of the Dermoptera and Hyracoidae and the Chiropteran families of Emballonuridae and Pteropodidae and to varying degrees within many carnivorian taxa.

Complete postorbital bars and well-developed postorbital processes, retaining gaps of mere centimetres, spanned by the postorbital ligament, occur as polymorphisms within a number of pteropodid and hyracoid taxa.
