= Sopas Formation =

Geologic formation in Uruguay

- Stratigraphic range: Late Pleistocene; ~0.07–0.014 Ma
- Type: Geological formation

Location
- Country: Uruguay
- Extent: Paraná Basin

Type section
- Named for: Arroyo Sopas

The Sopas Formation is a Late Pleistocene geologic formation in Uruguay.

== Fossil content ==
The following fossils have been reported from the formation:

=== Didelphimorphia ===
Genus	Species	Family	Locality	Material	Notes	Images
Didelphis	D. cf albiventris	Didelphidae	Sopas Creek Río Arapey Grande			

=== Xenarthra ===
Genus	Species	Family	Locality	Material	Notes	Images
Propraopus	P. sp	Dasypodidae	Sopas Creek Pintado Malo Creek			
Dasypus	Dasypus novemcinctus	Dasypodidae	Sopas Creek			
Glyptodon	G. clavipes	Glyptodontidae	Sopas Creek Pintado Malo Creek			
Panochthus	P. tuberculatus	Glyptodontidae	Sopas Creek Pintado Malo Creek			
Neuryurus	N. rudis	Glyptodontidae	Pintado			
Pampatherium	P. humboldtii	Pampatheriidae	Pintado Malo Creek			
Glossotherium	G.robustum	Mylodontidae	Sopas Creek Pintado			
Lestodon	L. armatus	Mylodontidae	Pintado			
cf. Scelidotherium	S. sp	Mylodontidae	Malo Creek			
Megatherium	M. americanum	Megatheriidae	Pintado Malo Creek			
Nothrotherium	N.maquinense	Nothrotheriidae	Sopas Creek			

=== Proboscidea ===
Genus	Species	Family	Locality	Material	Notes	Images
Gomphotheriidae indet.		Gomphotheriidae	Pintado			

=== Meridiungulata ===
Genus	Species	Family	Locality	Material	Notes	Images
Neolicaphrium	N. recens	Proterotheriidae	Sopas Creek Río Arapey Grande Pintado Malo Creek			
Macrauchenia	M. patagonica	Macraucheniidae	Sopas Creek Malo Creek			
Toxodon	T. platensis	Toxodontidae	Pintado			

Perissodactyla

Genus	Species	Family	Locality	Material	Notes	Images
Tapirus	Tapirus terrestris	Tapiridae	Sopas Creek Pintado Malo Creek			
Equus	E. neogens	Equidae	Sopas Creek Pintado			
Hippidion	H. principale	Equidae	Sopas Creek Pintado			

Artiodactyla

Genus	Species	Family	Locality	Material	Notes	Images
Antifer	A.ultra	Cervidae	Sopas Creek Pintado			
Ozotoceros	O. bezoarticus	Cervidae	Pintado Malo Creek		The Modern Pampas Deer	
Morenelaphus	brachyceros	Cervidae	Pintado			
Paraceros	P. fragilis	Cervidae	Pintado			
Tayassu	Tayassu pecari	Tayassuidae	Sopas Creek		White-Lipped Peccary	
Catagonus	C. sp	Tayassuidae	Sopas Creek Pintado			
Hemiauchenia	H. paradoxa	Camelidae	Sopas Creek Pintado Malo Creek			
Llama	L. sp	Camelidae	Sopas Creek Pintado			

=== Carnivora ===
Genus	Species	Family	Locality	Material	Notes	Images
Puma	P. concolor	Felidae	Sopas Creek Pintado		A mountain lion	
Panthera	P. onca	Felidae	Sopas Creek Malo Creek		A Jaguar	
Smilodon	S. fatalis	Felidae	Tres Cruces Grande Creek			
Smilodon	S. populator	Felidae	Pintado Malo Creek			
Leopardus	L. pardalis	Felidae	Malo Creek			
Lontra	L. longicaudis	Mustelidae	Malo Creek			
Dusicyon	D. avus	Canidae	Sopas Creek			
Lycalopex	L. gymnoceras	Canidae	Sopas Creek Malo Creek			
Protocyon	P. troglodytes	Canidae	Sopas Creek			
Tremarctinae indt		Ursidae	Pintado			

Rodentia

Genus	Species	Family	Locality	Material	Notes	Images
Cavia	C. sp	Caviidae	Sopas Creek Pintado Malo Creek			
Microcavia	M. criolloensis	Caviidae	Sopas Creek			
Neochoerus	N. cf. aesopi	Caviidae	Malo Creek			
Hydrochoerus	H. hydrochaeris	Caviidae	Pintado Malo Creek		Capybara	
Dolichotis	D. sp.	Caviidae	Malo Creek			
Galea	G. sp.	Caviidae	Malo Creek			
Holochilus	H. sp.	Cricetidae	Pintado			
Lundomys	L. molitor	Cricetidae	Pintado			
Reithrodon	R. sp.	Cricetidae	Malo Creek			
cf. Wilfredomys	cf. W. oenax	Cricetidae	Malo Creek			
Coendou	C. magnus	Erethizontidae	Pintado Malo Creek			
Myocastor	M. coypus	Echimyidae	Pintado		Nutria	

== See also ==
- List of fossiliferous stratigraphic units in Uruguay

== Bibliography ==
- Corona, Andrea; Ubilla, Martín; Perea, Daniel (2019), "New records and diet reconstruction using dental microwear analysis for Neolicaphrium recens Frenguelli, 1921 (Litopterna, Proterotheriidae)", Andean Geology, 46: 153–167, doi:10.5027/andgeoV46n1-3136, hdl:20.500.12008/22426
- M. Ubilla. 1985. Mamíferos fósiles, geocronología y paleoecología de la Fm. Sopas (Pleistoceno sup.) del Uruguay. Ameghiniana 22(3–4):185-196.
