= Pseudobrachytherium =

Pseudobrachytherium Temporal range: Late Miocene

Scientific classification
- Kingdom: Animalia
- Phylum: Chordata
- Class: Mammalia
- Order: †Litopterna
- Family: †Proterotheriidae
- Genus: †Pseudobrachytherium; Corona et al., 2020
- Species: †P. breve

Binomial name
- †Pseudobrachytherium breve Corona et al., 2020

Extinct genus of mammals

Pseudobrachytherium is an extinct genus of proterotheriid from the Late Miocene of Uruguay. It is only known from the type species P. breve, named in 2020 by Corona and colleagues for an almost complete skull found in the greenish pelite of the San Pedro member of the Camacho Formation, which is Huayquerian in age. The genus name is derived from the similarity to the proterotheriid Brachytherium at first glance, with the species name from the Latin for "short", referencing the short groove on the rear of the second molars.
