= Caviodon =

Caviodon Temporal range: Late Miocene-Late Pliocene (Montehermosan-Chapadmalalan) ~6.8–3.0 Ma

Scientific classification
- Domain: Eukaryota
- Kingdom: Animalia
- Phylum: Chordata
- Class: Mammalia
- Order: Rodentia
- Family: Caviidae
- Genus: †Caviodon; Ameghino, 1885

Extinct genus of rodents

Caviodon is an extinct genus of Late Miocene to Late Pliocene (Chapadmalalan to Montehermosan in the SALMA classification) rodents, related to the modern capybara. Fossils of Caviodon have been found in Argentina, Venezuela, and Brazil.

Known species include:

- †C. andalhualensis Perez et al. 2018
- †C. australis Ameghino 1888
- †C. cuyano Vucetitch et al. 2011
- †C. multiplicatus Ameghino 1885
- †C. pozzii Kraglievich 1927
