= Antifer =

Antifer Temporal range: Early-Late Pleistocene (Uquian-Lujanian) ~2.588–0.012 Ma

Scientific classification
- Kingdom: Animalia
- Phylum: Chordata
- Class: Mammalia
- Order: Artiodactyla
- Family: Cervidae
- Subfamily: Capreolinae
- Tribe: Rangiferini
- Genus: †Antifer; Ameghino 1889

Species
- A. crassus Rusconi 1954; A. niemeyeri; A. ultra

Extinct genus of deer

Antifer is an extinct genus of large herbivorous deer belonging to the tribe Odocoileini native to South America during the Pleistocene, becoming extinct around 12,000 years ago. It was one of the largest South American deer genera, with an estimated body mass of up to 200 kilograms (440 lb), comparable to red deer, considerably exceeding the marsh deer, the largest living South American deer species in size. The genus has large antlers that could reach a length of over 60 centimetres (24 in).

== Taxonomy ==
Antifer was named by Ameghino (1889) based on Captain Antifer in a Jules Verne novel describing his voyage of discovery in the Southern Hemisphere. It was assigned to Cervidae by Carroll (1988).

== Fossil distribution ==
The fossil remains are confined to southern Brazil, the Sopas Formation of Uruguay, central Chile and Argentina. It is known mostly from large, non-palmated shed antlers.
