= Postorbital process =

Projection on the frontal bone near the rear upper edge of the eye socket

The postorbital process is a projection on the frontal bone near the rear upper edge of the eye socket. In many mammals, it reaches down to the zygomatic arch, forming the postorbital bar.

== See also ==
- Orbital process
