= Wainka =

Wainka Temporal range: Middle Paleocene ~62 Ma

Scientific classification
- Kingdom: Animalia
- Phylum: Chordata
- Class: Mammalia
- Order: †Litopterna
- Family: †Proterotheriidae
- Subfamily: †Anisolambdinae
- Genus: †Wainka; Simpson 1935

Type species
- †Wainka tshotshe Simpson, 1935

Species
- W. tshotshe Simpson 1935

Extinct genus of mammals

Wainka is an extinct genus of South American mammal, belonging to the order Litopterna. It lived during the Middle Paleocene.

== Description ==
This animal is only known for a few teeth. The upper molars were almost triangular in shape, elongated, and possessed a rather massive paracone and metacone, more developed than other contemporary South American ungulates such as Anisolambda; the upper molars were devoid of mesostyle.

With some doubts, Wainka has also been attributed a lower molar with well-marked ridges.

== Classification ==
Wainka tshotshe was first described in 1935 by George Gaylord Simpson, based on an upper and lower molar, the latter of dubious attribution, from the Middle Paleocene of Cerro Redondo, Argentina. This animal has been attributed to various families of South American ungulates, such as the Notonychopidae and Proterotheriidae. Regardless, Wainka was a basal form and it is very likely that it was an early litoptern. Its real affinities are still unclear. Other litopterns from approximately the same age are Notonychops and Requisia.

== Bibliography ==
- G. G. Simpson. 1935. Descriptions of the oldest known South American mammals, from the Rio Chico Formation. American Museum Novitates 793:1-25
- G. G. Simpson. 1948. The beginning of the age of mammals in South America. Part I. Bulletin of the American Museum of Natural History 91:1-232
- J. F. Bonaparte and J. Morales. 1997. Un primitivo Notonychopidae (Litopterna) del Paleoceno inferior de Punta Peligro, Chubut, Argentina. Estudios Geológicos 53(5-6):263-274
- Buckley, M. (2015). "Ancient collagen reveals evolutionary history of the endemic South American 'ungulates'". Proceedings of the Royal Society B: Biological Sciences. 282 (1806): 20142671–20142671. doi:10.1098/rspb.2014.2671
