= Xesmodon =

Xesmodon Temporal range: Middle-Late Eocene ~46–34 Ma

Scientific classification
- Kingdom: Animalia
- Phylum: Chordata
- Class: Mammalia
- Order: †Litopterna
- Family: †Proterotheriidae
- Subfamily: †Anisolambdinae
- Genus: †Xesmodon; Berg, 1899

Type species
- †Xesmodon langi (Roth, 1899)

Species
- X. langi (Roth, 1899); X. prolixus (Roth, 1899)

Synonyms
- Glyphodon Roth, 1899

Extinct genus of mammals from South America

Xesmodon is an extinct genus of mammal. It lived from the Middle to the Late Eocene, in what is today South America.

== Taxonomy ==
Xesmodon was named by Carlos Berg in 1899. Its type species is Xesmodon langi, and a second species, Xesmodon prolixus, may also belong to the genus. Both species were named by Santiago Roth in 1899. The type and only known specimen of Xesmodon langi is a poorly preserved skull found at the locality Cañadón Colorado in Argentina. The type and only known specimen of Xesmodon prolixus is a fragmentary mandible with two teeth found near Lago Musters in the Chubut Province of Argentina. Both species are from the Mustersan South American land mammal age.

Some researchers classify Xesmodon in Didolodontidae, whereas others classify it in Anisolambdinae, a subfamily of Proterotheriidae. Proterotheriidae is part of the order Litopterna, whereas didolodontids are considered condylarths, albeit likely to be closely related to litopterns.

== Description ==
This genus is known from partial cranial remains, permitting to partially reconstruct its appearance. The skull was rather long and low, and had particularly large orbites positioned near the middle of the skull. The nasal bones were elongated, while the frontal region was flat and table-like; long and narrow postorbital apophyses separated from this region, to which jugal apophyses were not opposed. The zygomatic arch was rather thin. The upper molars of Xesmodon had a very strong independent hypocone.

== History of study ==
In 1899, Santiago Roth named a new genus and species of mammal, Glyphodon langi, on the basis of a poorly preserved skull from Patagonia. He identified it as having litoptern affinities. In the same paper, he named the species Megacrodon prolixus. However, the name Glyphodon had already been given to a snake by Albert Günther in 1858, so later the same year, Carlos Berg proposed the replacement name Xesmodon for Roth's genus. In 1948, George Gaylord Simpson tentatively reclassified Megacrodon prolixus as a second species of Xesmodon. Simpson was unsure whether Xesmodon was a didolodontid or a litoptern. In 1983, Richard Cifelli assigned Xesmodon to Anisolambdinae. In research by Miguel Soria published in 2001, he classified Xesmodon in Didolodontidae.
