= Prolicaphrium =

Prolicaphrium Temporal range: Early Miocene (Colhuehuapian) ~21–18 Ma

Scientific classification
- Kingdom: Animalia
- Phylum: Chordata
- Class: Mammalia
- Infraclass: Placentalia
- Order: †Litopterna
- Family: †Proterotheriidae
- Subfamily: †Proterotheriinae
- Genus: †Prolicaphrium; Ameghino 1902

Type species
- †Prolicaphrium specillatum Ameghino, 1902

Species
- P. specillatum Ameghino 1902; P. spectabile Ameghino 1902

Extinct genus of litopterns

Prolicaphrium is an extinct genus of proterotheriid litoptern that lived during the Early Miocene, in what is now Argentina. Fossils have been found in the Sarmiento Formation of Argentina.

== Description ==
This animal may have been vaguely similar to a small horse, and, even if it is only known from incomplete fossils, it is possible to hypothesize on its appearance thanks to the comparison with its better-known relatives, such as Thoatherium, Proterotherium and Diadiaphorus. Compared to the latter, Prolicaphrium was more basal, especially regarding its molars : the six primary denticles were well developed and independent. The last molar had a reduced posterior lobe both in its external and internal parts. Prolicaphrium was also characterized by a skull with very elongated nasal bones pointing forward, to the contrary of the previously mentioned genera.

== Classification ==
Prolicaphrium is a member of the Proterotheriidae, a family of litopterns with a build vaguely evocative of small horses. The genus Prolicaphrium was first described in 1902 by Florentino Ameghino, based on fossil remains from Early Miocene terrains of Patagonia, and it was considered to belong to an animal ancestral of the also Early Miocene genus Licaphrium (now considered a synonym of Anisolophus. Ameghino described two species : the type species, Prolicaphrium specillatum, and the better known P. spectabile.A third species described by Ameghino, P. festinum, was later attributed to a new genus, Licaphrops (a junior synonym of Lambdaconus), while P. sanalfonensis, initially described in 1997 and coming from the Middle Miocene of Colombia was attributed to the new genus Mesolicaphrium.
