= Neodolodus =

Neodolodus Temporal range: Middle Miocene (Laventan) ~13.8–11.8 Ma

Scientific classification
- Domain: Eukaryota
- Kingdom: Animalia
- Phylum: Chordata
- Class: Mammalia
- Order: †Litopterna
- Family: †Proterotheriidae
- Genus: †Neodolodus; Hoffstetter & Soria, 1986
- Species: †N. colombianus

Binomial name
- †Neodolodus colombianus Hoffstetter & Soria, 1986

Synonyms
- Prothoatherium colombianus Cifelli & Guerrero Diaz, 1989; Lambdaconus colombianus Carrillo et al., 2018

Extinct genus of litopterns

Neodolodus is a genus of extinct litoptern from the late middle Miocene of southern Colombia. It was named in 1986 by Hoffstetter and Soria, for the species Neodolodus colombianus from the Castilletes Formation and the La Victoria and Villavieja Formations of the Honda Group. The type species N. colombianus is known from a right mandibular ramus, teeth, and part of the fore- and hindlimbs. Neodolodus has been classified as a species of Prothoatherium or Lambdaconus, but was recognized as a distinct genus by McGrath and colleagues in 2020. The taxon was recovered in a phylogenetic analysis as the sister taxon of Protheosodon, between other proterotheriid genera like Picturotherium and Anisolophus.
