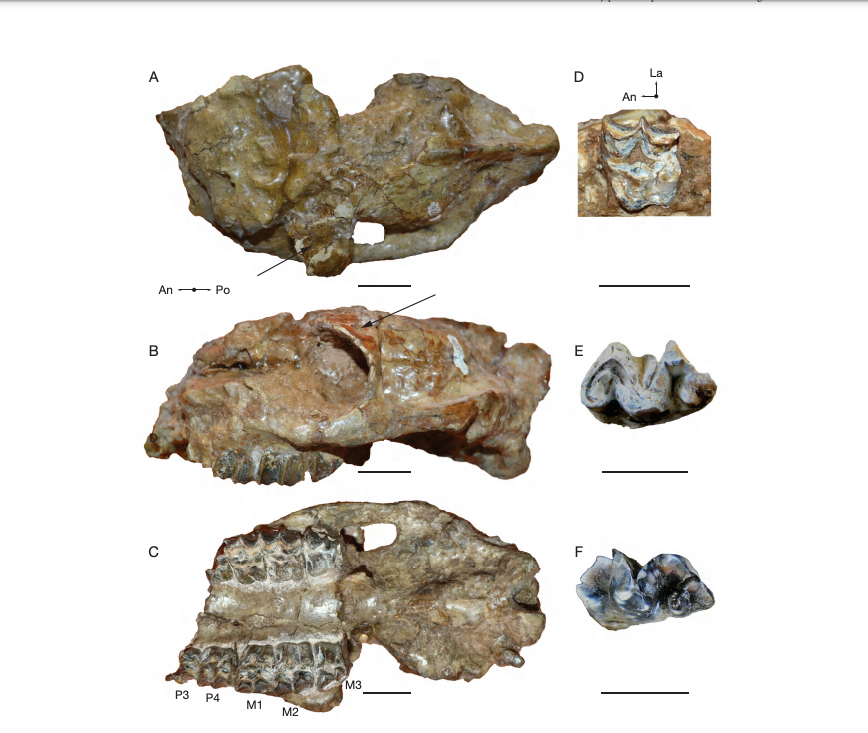
- Partial skull of Neobrachytherium sp.

Scientific classification
- Kingdom: Animalia
- Phylum: Chordata
- Class: Mammalia
- Order: †Litopterna
- Family: †Proterotheriidae
- Subfamily: †Proterotheriinae
- Genus: †Neobrachytherium; Soria, 2001

Type species
- †Licaphrium intermedium Moreno & Mercerat, 1891

Other species
- Neobrachytherium morenoi (Rovereto, 1914); Neobrachytherium ameghinoi Soria, 2001; Neobrachytherium ullumense Soria, 2001

= Neobrachytherium =

Neobrachytherium Temporal range: Late Miocene-Late Pliocene (Chasicoan-Chapadmalalan) 9–4 Ma

Extinct genus of litopterns

Neobrachytherium is an extinct genus of proterotheriid mammal from the Late Miocene of Argentina and Uruguay. It is represented by multiple species, including the type N. intermedium, originally named in 1891 by Moreno and Mercerat as a species of Licaphrium, N. morenoi, originally named in 1914 by Rovereto as a species of Brachytherium, and N. ameghinoi and N. ullumense, named in 2001 by Soria, who reclassified all the species in the new genus Neobrachytherium. The various species are known from cranial and dental material from the Corral Quemado, Loma de las Tapias and Ituzaingó Formations. Neobrachytherium may be closely related to Thoatherium, Diadiaphorus and Thoatheriopsis.
