= Megadolodus =

Megadolodus Temporal range: Middle Miocene (Laventan) ~13.5–11.8 Ma

Scientific classification
- Kingdom: Animalia
- Phylum: Chordata
- Class: Mammalia
- Order: †Litopterna
- Family: †Proterotheriidae
- Genus: †Megadolodus; McKenna, 1956
- Species: †M. molariformis

Binomial name
- †Megadolodus molariformis McKenna, 1956

Extinct genus of litopterns

Megadolodus is an extinct genus of proterotheriid litopterns that inhabited South America during the Miocene epoch.

== History ==
The first fossils of Megadolodus were uncovered from the Villavieja Formation, in the fossil locality La Venta, in what is today Colombia, in terrains dated from the Middle Miocene, between 13.5 and 11.8 millions of years ago. The genus was described in 1956 after the holotype UCMP 39270, consisting in a left mandible preserving the fourth premolar, the first molar and roots from the second molar, and discovered during an expedition organized by the University of California and directed by Ruben A. Stirton. Those few remains led Malcolm Carnegie McKenna, who described them in his 1956 article, to believe they originated from a late surviving Didolodontidae, a family of primitive ungulates that went extinct during the end of the Eocene, 25 millions of years before the apparition of Megadolodus in the fossil record; hence its generic name, meaning "large Didolodus", a characteristic genus from this family. This classification supported the theory that the South American tropical zone acted as a refuge for primitive species during the Neogene.

New remains of Megadolodus were only uncovered during the 1980s from the Honda Group, in the Magdalena River Valley of Colombia, including parts of the legs, mandibles, teeth, vertebrae, pelvis, and ribs, permitting a better understanding of the general anatomy of the animal, and allowing to compare it with litopterns, resulting in its reclassification as an unusual member of the family Proterotheriidae. The discovery of a similar proterotheriid, Bounodus enigmaticus from Venezuela, confirmed that they belonged to a lineage of specialised litopterns from northern South America, classified in its own subfamily, the Megadolodinae. In 2024, a partial mandible and teeth of Megadolodus were discovered from the Ipururo Formation, located in the Peruvian Amazon.

== Description ==
Megadolodus was a member of the Proterotheriidae, a family of small and medium-sized litopterns who produced in a few derived genera forms loosely evoking horses, such as the well known genera Thoatherium and Diadiaphorus. Megadolodus molariformis, the only known species from its genus, was itself characterized by its shorter and stronger limbs, its large tusk-like canines which sharpened each other, and a large hypocone on the third molar. The genus had only 10 to 11 thoracic vertebrae, and 5 lumbar vertebrae. Its bunodont molars were very similar in morphology to those of suids.

Like some perissodactyls such as tapirs, Megadolodus had three toes on each limb, with the axis on the third toe, while the second and fourth toe were smaller and located in each side of the leg, without touching the ground. Weight estimates based on the comparison of its limbs with those of extant mammals suggest a weight between 30 and 200 kg, probably more precisely between 65 and 80 kg.

== Palaeoecology ==
The fact that its body was not as slender than other proterotheriids, along with the fact that its canines and its bunodont molars are similar to those found in modern-day peccaries suggest that it was an animal similar in habits to modern members of Suidae, living in forested environments such as La Venta and eating roots and fruits. Dental mesowear analysis suggests, however, that M. molariformis had a significantly more abrasive diet than most suids; the closest dietary analogue of this megadolodine was the present-day babirusa.
