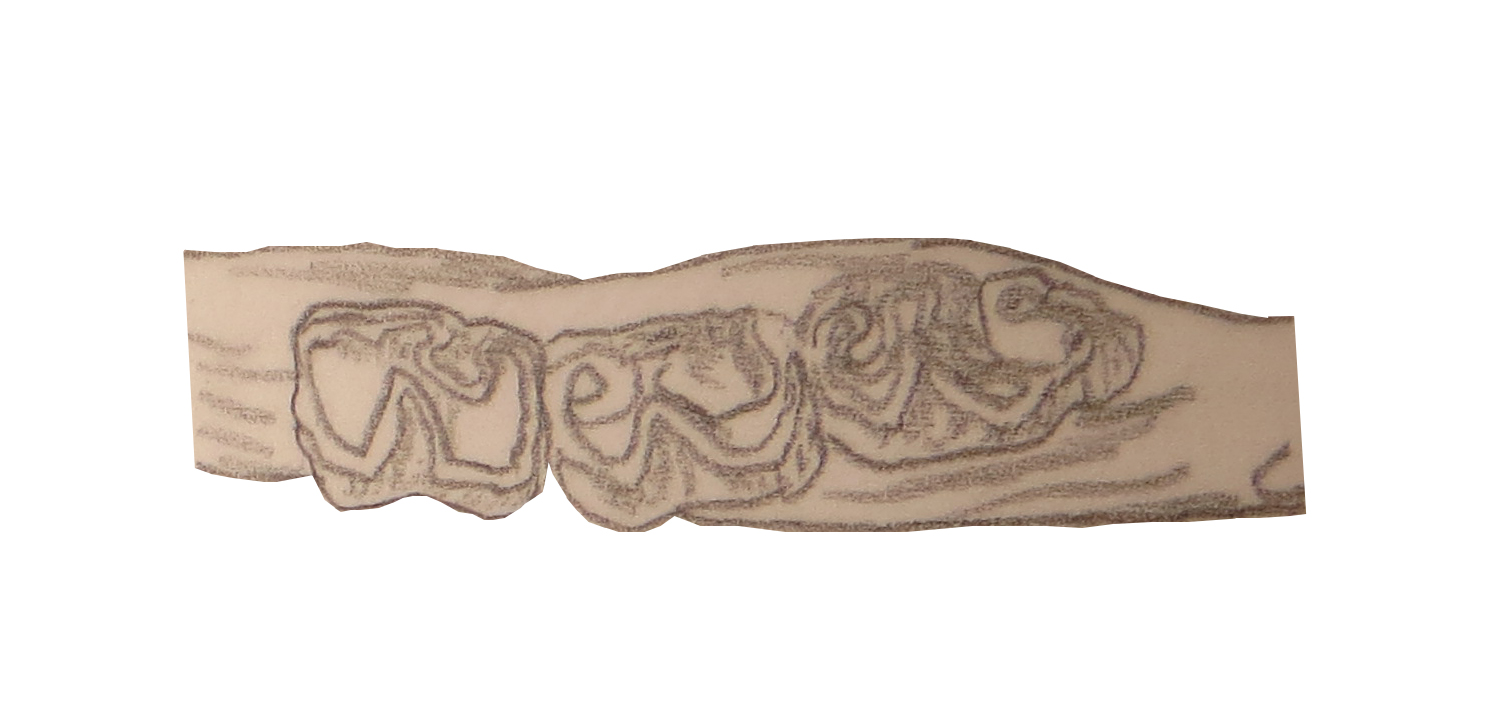
- Inferior teeth of Anisolambda

Scientific classification
- Domain: Eukaryota
- Kingdom: Animalia
- Phylum: Chordata
- Class: Mammalia
- Order: †Litopterna
- Superfamily: †Proterotherioidea
- Family: †Proterotheriidae
- Subfamily: †Anisolambdinae; Cifelli, 1983

Genera
- Paranisolambda Cifelli, 1983; Anisolambda Ameghino, 1897

= Anisolambdinae =

Anisolambdinae Temporal range: Eocene–Miocene

Extinct subfamily of litopterns

Anisolambdinae is an extinct subfamily of litoptern ungulates known from the Eocene–Miocene of South America. Members of the group are only known for the brachydont teeth.

== Etymology ==
Anisolambdinae refers to their similarity to the type taxon: Anisolambda.

== Description ==
The anisolambdines are small litopterns known only by teeth. They have a well developed paralophid in the lower molars, ending in a large paraconid.

== Distribution ==
They are found in Argentina, Brazil and Colombia.
