= Villarroelia =

Villarroelia Temporal range: Middle Miocene (Laventan) 13.8–11.8 Ma

Scientific classification
- Kingdom: Animalia
- Phylum: Chordata
- Class: Mammalia
- Order: †Litopterna
- Family: †Proterotheriidae
- Genus: †Villarroelia; Cifelli and Guerrero Diaz, 1997
- Species: †V. totoyoi

Binomial name
- †Villarroelia totoyoi Cifelli and Guerrero Diaz, 1997

Extinct genus of litopterns

Villarroelia is an extinct genus of proterotheriid from the Middle Miocene of Colombia.

== Etymology ==
The genus name, Villarroelia refers to the paleontologist Carlos Villarroel, for his contributions to the understanding of prehistoric South American mammals, while the specific name, V. toyotoi refers to the indigenous chief Toyotó, whose tribe was present in the area of the Villavieja River, in the present-day Huila Department in Colombia, where its fossils were discovered in sediments corresponding to the La Victoria Formation, belonging to the Honda Group of the Middle Miocene.

== Description ==
This animal is known from the holotype specimen IGM 250965, a partial skull lacking the anterior rostrum, although it retains the roots of the upper first premolar (P1), and some additional remains, including another skull, UCMP 39970, several molar teeth, fragments of the mandible, two cervical vertebrae, the right scapula, a distal end of the radius, the proximal end of the right femur, the left tibia, the calcaneus and several phalanges of the fingers. Its remains indicate that it was a running herbivore similar in shape and size to the southern genera Proterotherium and Anisolophus, although it had a greater degree of molarization of its premolar teeth, especially P3 and P4. Given that its remains show a mixture of primitive and advanced features it is difficult to say whether these resemblances correspond to their actual phylogenetics, awaiting more comprehensive analyses of the family Proterotheriidae.
