= Eoauchenia =

Eoauchenia Temporal range: Late Miocene-Early Pliocene (Huayquerian-Montehermosan) ~6.8–5.3 Ma

Scientific classification
- Domain: Eukaryota
- Kingdom: Animalia
- Phylum: Chordata
- Class: Mammalia
- Order: †Litopterna
- Family: †Proterotheriidae
- Genus: †Eoauchenia; Ameghino, 1887
- Species: †E. primitiva

Binomial name
- †Eoauchenia primitiva Ameghino, 1887

Extinct genus of litopterns

Eoauchenia is a genus of extinct proterotheriid from the Late Miocene and Early Pliocene of Argentina. The genus was named by Ameghino in 1887 for the type species E. primitiva, which was originally known from the early Pliocene Monte Hermoso Formation of the Montehermosan age of Buenos Aires Province, but has since been found in the Cerro Azul Formation of the late Huayquerian of La Pampa Province. The fossils originally known included postcranial remains like foot material, but teeth, a skull and skeleton, and mandibles and further postcrania have since been referred to Eoauchenia, which can be distinguished from Epitherium found alongside it by more gracile bones.
