= Mesolicaphrium =

Mesolicaphrium Temporal range: Middle Miocene (Laventan) ~14–12 Ma

Scientific classification
- Kingdom: Animalia
- Phylum: Chordata
- Class: Mammalia
- Order: †Litopterna
- Family: †Proterotheriidae
- Genus: †Mesolicaphrium; McGrath et al., 2020
- Species: †M. sanalfonense

Binomial name
- †Mesolicaphrium sanalfonense (Cifelli & Guerrero, 1997)

Synonyms
- Prolicaphrium sanalfonensis Cifelli & Guerrero, 1997

Extinct genus of litopterns

Mesolicaphrium is a genus of extinct litoptern from the late middle Miocene of southern Colombia. It was named in 2020 by Andrew McGrath and colleagues, for the species previously classified as Prolicaphrium sanalfonensis from the La Victoria and Villavieja Formations of the Honda Group, Colombia. The type species is M. sanalfonense, known from the jaw symphysis and two right mandibular rami, and teeth. Mesolicaphrium is derived from the similarity to the names Prolicaphrium and Neolicaphrium, and being in between both taxa in age. The taxon was recovered in a phylogenetic analysis as the sister taxon of Diplasiotherium, closely related to Olisanophus.

== Description ==
The deciduous mandibular premolars of M. sanalfonense all have two roots. The dp_{1} is smaller mesiodistally and labiolingually than the others. The dp_{2} differs from the dp_{1} in having its paraconid attach to the paralophid near the tooth's mesial end and in the greater size of its metaconid spur, in addition to the former tooth being larger in overall size. The dp_{3} is molariform, exhibiting a double crescent morphology. The dp_{4} differs from the dp_{3} in having a paraconid that is smaller and that attaches to the mesiolingual end of the paracristid, as well as in having a smaller ectostylid.
