= Brachytherium =

Brachytherium Temporal range: Late Miocene-Late Pliocene (Chasicoan-Chapadmalalan) ~10.0–3.0 Ma

Scientific classification
- Kingdom: Animalia
- Phylum: Chordata
- Class: Mammalia
- Order: †Litopterna
- Family: †Proterotheriidae
- Genus: †Brachytherium; Ameghino, 1883

Type species
- †Brachytherium cuspidatum Ameghino, 1883

Synonyms
- Proterotherium gradatum Ameghino, 1891; Brachytherium gradatum (Ameghino, 1891) Ameghino, 1904; Lophogonodon gradatum (Ameghino, 1891) Soria, 2001; Lophogonodon paranensis Ameghino, 1904; Epitherium paranensis (Ameghino, 1904) Delupi de Bianchini & Bianchini, 1971; Licaphrium mesopotamiense Delupi de Bianchini & Bianchini, 1971

Extinct genus of litopterns

Brachytherium is an extinct genus of proterotheriid mammal from the Late Miocene to Late Pliocene of Argentina. It is represented by the type and only species B. cuspidatum, a taxon named in 1883 by Ameghino for a partial mandible with teeth. Though it was considered a dubious taxon at times, Brachytherium was revised as valid by Schmidt in 2015, who also synonymized the species Proterotherium gradatum and Lophogonodon paranensis, expanding the material known, all of which is from the Ituzaingó Formation. Some material previously referred to Brachytherium has been given the new name Neobrachytherium.
