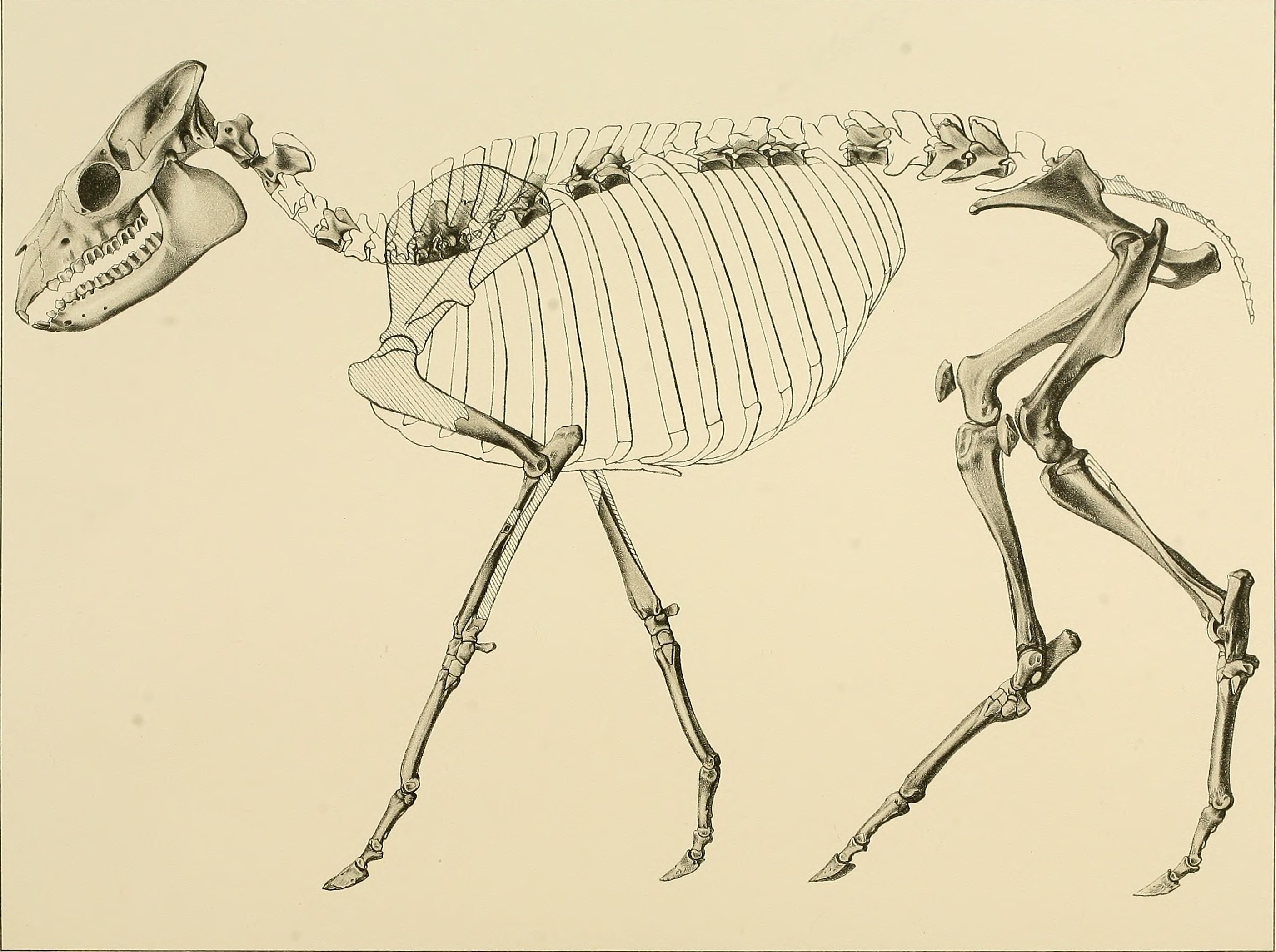
- Skeleton of Thoatherium

Scientific classification
- Kingdom: Animalia
- Phylum: Chordata
- Class: Mammalia
- Order: †Litopterna
- Suborder: †Lopholipterna
- Superfamily: †Proterotherioidea
- Family: †Proterotheriidae; Ameghino 1887

Synonyms
- Anisolambdidae Soria, 2001

= Proterotheriidae =

Proterotheriidae Temporal range: Eocene–Late Pleistocene

Extinct family of litopterns

Proterotheriidae is an extinct family of litoptern ungulates known from the Eocene to Late Pleistocene of South America. Members of the group were small to medium-sized cursorial herbivores with brachydont teeth, with their toes showing progressive reduction, with later members of the group bearing weight on a single large toe similar to living horses.

== Description ==
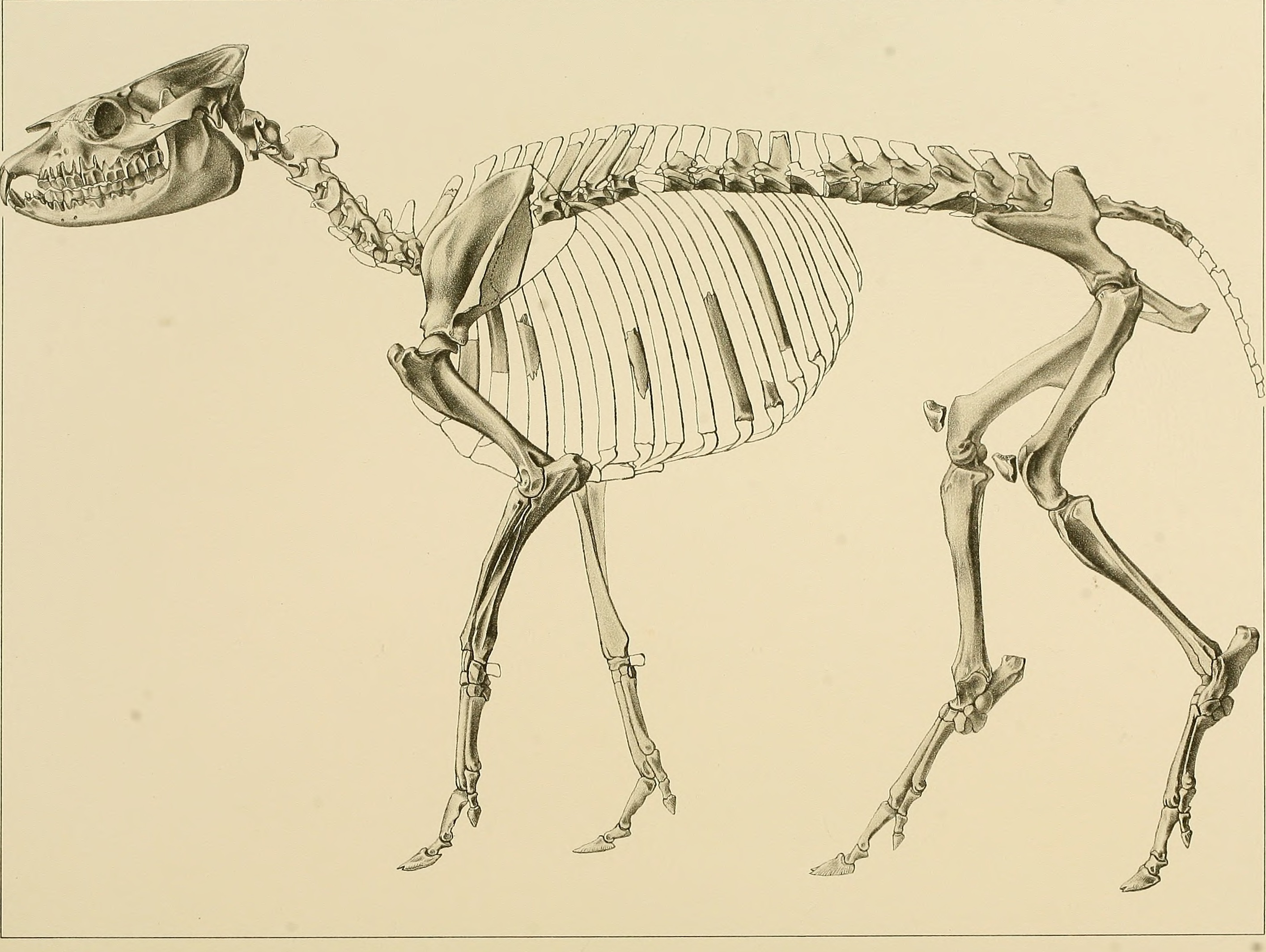
Skeleton of Diadiaphorus

Two subfamilies and 18 genera of Proterotheriidae are known. All forms were small or medium-sized. Typical is a reduction of the number of toes and brachydont or mesodont teeth. The family is recorded since the late Palaeocene. Various fossils are known from many parts of the South American continent. The diversity decreased in the Miocene to Pliocene and it has been assumed for a long time that they entirely disappeared in the late Pliocene. However, fossils found in Argentina, Brazil and Uruguay show that one member of the group, Neolicaphrium recens survived into the Late Pleistocene.

Better known genera of the family include Diadiaphorus and Thoatherium from the Miocene.

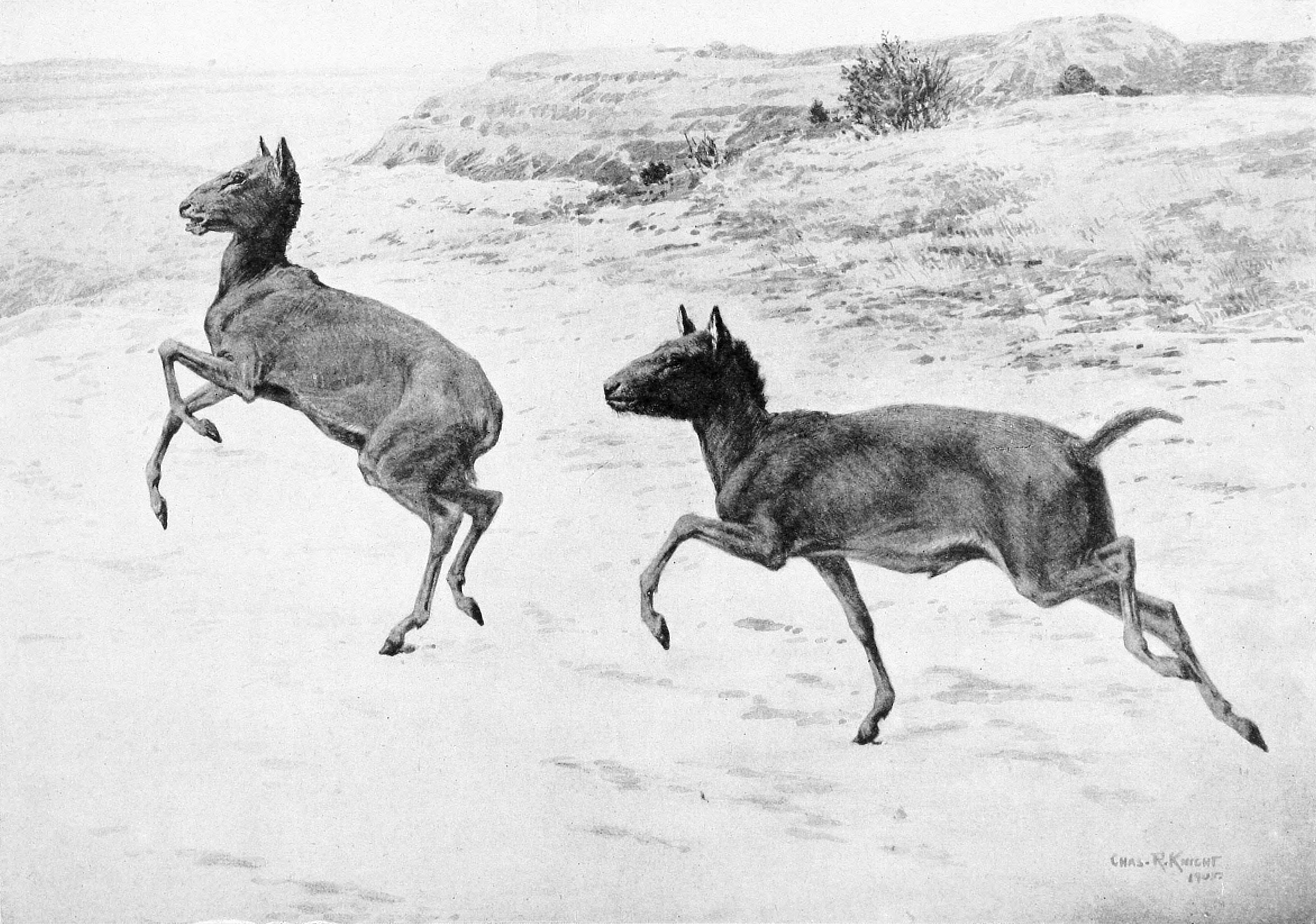
Interpretation of Thoatherium

== Taxonomy ==
- Proterotheriidae
  - Anisolambda
  - Anisolophus
  - Brachytherium
  - Diadiaphorus
  - Diplasiotherium
  - Eoauchenia
  - Eolicaphrium
  - Epecuenia
  - Epitherium
  - Guilielmofloweria
  - Heteroglyphis
  - Lambdaconus
  - Lambdaconops
  - Mesolicaphrium
  - Neobrachytherium
  - Neodolodus
  - Neolicaphrium
  - Oligopterna
  - Olisanophus
  - Paramacrauchenia
  - Paranisolambda
  - Picturotherium
  - Prolicaphrium
  - Promylophis
  - Proterotherium
  - Protheosodon
  - Pseudobrachytherium
  - Tetramerorhinus
  - Thoatherium
  - Thoatheriopsis
  - Villarroelia
  - Uruguayodon
  - Wainka
  - Xesmodon
  - Megadolodinae
    - Bounodus
    - Megadolodus
  - Indaleciidae
    - Adiantoides
    - Indalecia

Proterotheriidae is traditionally considered to include two subfamilies, Anisolambdinae and Proterotheriinae. Anisolambdinae (also called Anisolambdidae in some studies) was proposed to unite the primitive and earlier forms Anisolambda, Eolicaphrium, Paranisolambda, Protheosodon, Guilielmofloweria, Heteroglyphis, Lambdaconops, Wainka and Xesmodon. However, the phylogenetic analysis of McGrath and colleagues recovered the included genera to neither form their own clade, or to universally represent basal taxa outside the genera of Proterotheriinae per Soria, making Anisolambdinae a polyphyletic group of unrelated organisms.

Proterotheriidae was redefined by McGrath and colleagues in 2019 to be all taxa closer to Tetramerorhinus than Macrauchenia, Tricoelodus or Protolipterna. The cladogram below shows the modified results of their phylogenetic analysis, where incomplete taxa were placed based on morphology. The unrelated genera of the polyphyletic taxon Anisolambdinae or Anisolambdidae is highlighted in pink.

- Proterotheriidae
  - - Megadolodinae
      - Megadolodus
      - Bounodus
  - - - Indaleciidae
        - Indalecia
        - Adiantoides
    - - Paramacrauchenia
      - - Anisolambda
        - - Lambdaconus suinus
          - Lambdaconus inaequifacies
        - - Lambdaconus lacerum
          - - Paranisolambda
            - - Picturotherium
              - - - Neodolodus
                  - Protheosodon
                - - Anisolophus floweri
                  - - - Anisolophus australis
                      - - Anisolophus minusculus
                        - Prolicaphrium
                    - - - Olisanophus
                        - - Mesolicaphrium
                          - Diplasiotherium
                      - - Villarroelia
                        - - Tetramerorhinus fleaglei
                          - - Tetramerorhinus prosistens
                            - - - Tetramerorhinus cingulatum
                                - - Tetramerorhinus lucarius
                                  - Tetramerorhinus mixtum
                              - - - Diadiaphorus
                                  - Thoatherium
                                - - - Brachytherium
                                    - - Thoatheriopsis
                                      - - Proterotherium
                                        - Neobrachytherium ameghinoi
                                  - - Eoauchenia
                                    - Neobrachytherium ullumense
                                    - - Neobrachytherium morenoi
                                      - Neobrachytherium intermedium
                                    - - Neolicaphrium
                                      - - Epitherium
                                        - Uruguayodon

== Palaeobiology ==
=== Locomotion ===
Based on the morphology of their hindlimbs, proterotheriids likely locomoted by making use of a rotary or half-bound gait, in contrast to the transverse gallop used by equids.
