= Thoatheriopsis =

Thoatheriopsis Temporal range: Miocene

Scientific classification
- Domain: Eukaryota
- Kingdom: Animalia
- Phylum: Chordata
- Class: Mammalia
- Order: †Litopterna
- Family: †Proterotheriidae
- Genus: †Thoatheriopsis; Soria, 2001
- Species: †T. mendocensis

Binomial name
- †Thoatheriopsis mendocensis Soria, 2001

Extinct genus of litopterns

Thoatheriopsis is an extinct genus of proterotheriid from the Miocene of Mendoza Province, Argentina. The taxon is known only from the specimen MLP 81-XI-28-1, which includes an upper tooth row, and was named as the new binomial Thoatheriopsis mendocensis by Miguel Soria posthumously in 2001. The only provenance information known about the specimen is that it comes from the Anfiteatro de Cacheuta, and it is probably from the Mariño Formation, of which it could be from either the Areniscas Entrecruzadas or the Estratos de Mariño Member, which are both present at the known location of discovery. This means that the age for Thoatheriopsis cannot be determined beyond either being from the Santacrucian or Laventan South American Land Mammal Ages in the Early or Middle Miocene. Thoatheriopsis was found to be a close relative of Diadiaphorus and Neobrachytherium.
