= Chapadmalalan =

Period of geologic time

The Chapadmalalan ('Chapalmalan') age is a period of geologic time (~5.0–3.3 Ma) in the Pliocene epoch of the Neogene, used more specifically in the South American Land Mammal Ages.

== Chronology ==
The Chapadmalalan follows the Montehermosan age and precedes the Marplatan age. The source locality for the Chapadmalalan is the Chapadmalal Formation near Chapadmalal, Buenos Aires Province, Argentina.

== Fauna ==
=== 'Lower Chapadmalalan' ===
The Chapadmalalan age was previously divided into a lower and upper stage, with the lower stage hosting the "Neocavia depressidens" biozone. However, this was revised into a single biozone.

=== Biozone ===
Previously characterizing the Upper Chapadmalalan, the taxa Paraglyptodon chapadmalensis previously defined the biozone of the entire Chapadmalalan age, however revisions found P. chapadmalensis to be a juvenile of Glyptodon.
