= Olisanophus =

Olisanophus Temporal range: Miocene, 14–12 Ma

Scientific classification
- Domain: Eukaryota
- Kingdom: Animalia
- Phylum: Chordata
- Class: Mammalia
- Order: †Litopterna
- Family: †Proterotheriidae
- Genus: †Olisanophus; McGrath et al. (2020)

Type species
- †Olisanophus riorosarioensis McGrath et al. (2020)

Other species
- Olisanophus akilachuta McGrath et al. (2020)

Extinct genus of mammals

Olisanophus is a genus of extinct litoptern from the late middle Miocene of southern Bolivia. It was named in 2020 by Andrew McGrath and colleagues, for two distinct species from the same deposits of an unnamed formation of the Honda Group. The type species is O. riorosarioensis, known from elements of the partial upper and lower left and right dentitions and possibly a partial mandible, and the referred species is O. akilachuta, known for 6 teeth. Some intermediate material from the same deposits was referred to Olisanophus sp., not showing diagnostic features of either species. Both species were recovered together in a phylogenetic analysis, where they were sister taxa to a group of Diplasiotherium and Mesolicaphrium.
