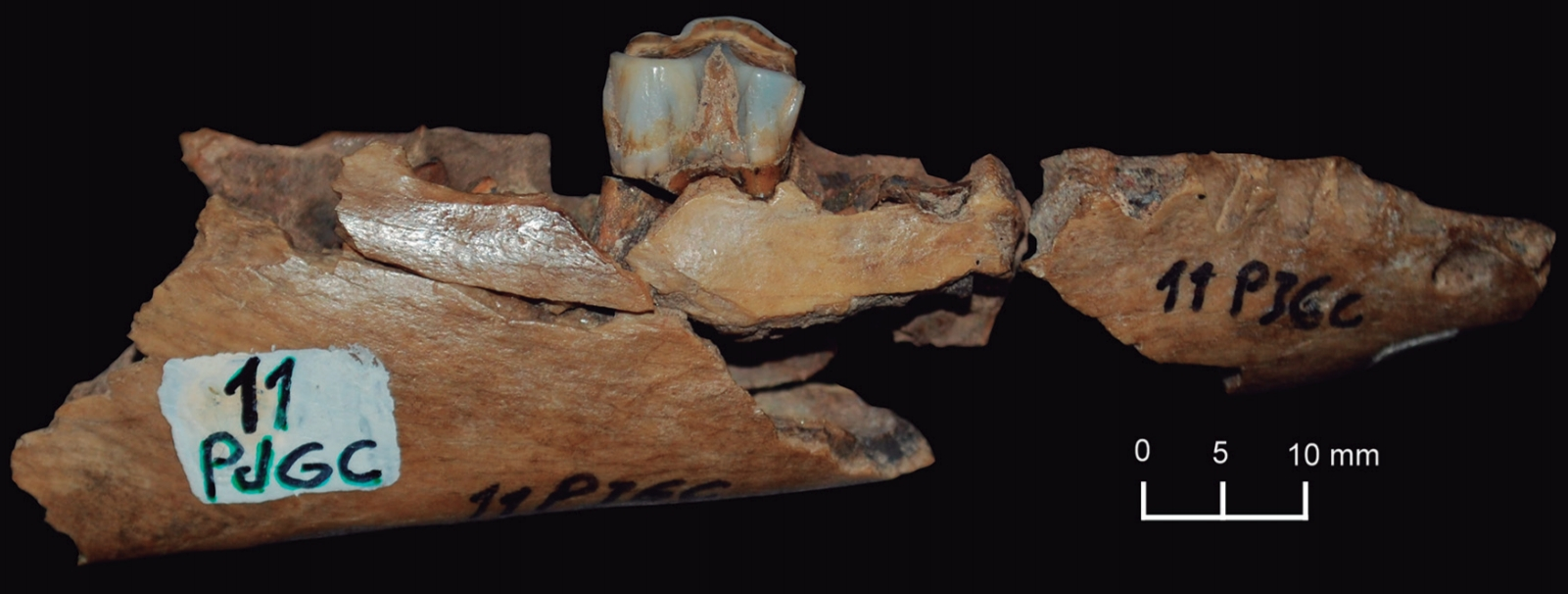
- Right hemimandible of N. recens

Scientific classification
- Kingdom: Animalia
- Phylum: Chordata
- Class: Mammalia
- Order: †Litopterna
- Family: †Proterotheriidae
- Subfamily: †Proterotheriinae
- Genus: †Neolicaphrium; Frenguelli 1921

Type species
- †Neolicaphrium recens Frenguelli 1921

Species
- N. major Soria 2001; N. recens Frenguelli 1921 (type)

= Neolicaphrium =

Neolicaphrium Temporal range: Late Pliocene-Early Holocene (Chapadmalalan-Lujanian) ~4.0–0.011 Ma

Extinct genus of ungulate mammal

Neolicaphrium is an extinct genus of ungulate mammal belonging to the extinct order Litopterna. This animal lived from the Late Pliocene (Chapadmalalan) to the Late Pleistocene (Lujanian) in southern South America, being the last survivor of the family Proterotheriidae.

== Species ==
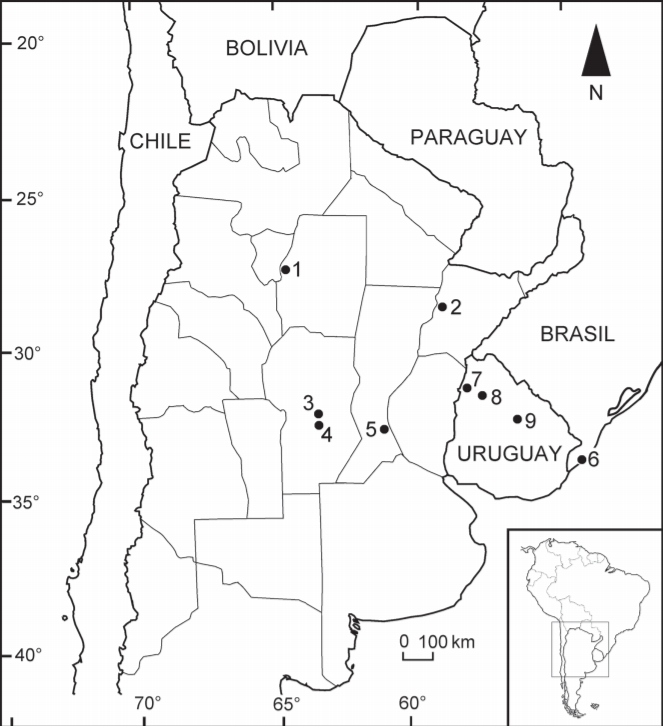
Fossil locations of N. recens

The genus includes two species, the type species N. recens and N. major. The fossil found of N. major, one jaw, comes from the Miramar Formation in Chapadmalal, Argentina and correspond to the Chapadmalalan mammal age of South America (4.0 to 3.0 million years ago, in the Pliocene). N. recens appeared in the Ensenadan age (1.2-0.8 million years ago) and the species survived until the Lujanian age (800,000 to 11,000 years ago). Fossils of this species have been found in the Argentine provinces of the northeast, in Córdoba, Corrientes, Tezzanos Pinto Formation, Santa Fe and Santiago del Estero, in the southern Brazilian state of Rio Grande do Sul and the Sopas Formation of the Salto Department in Uruguay. N. recens is known from a partial skull, partial jaws, teeth, and bones of the ankle and the forefeet. A fragmentary humerus, previously assigned to the doubtful species Proterotherium berroi, could also be referred to this species.

== Description ==
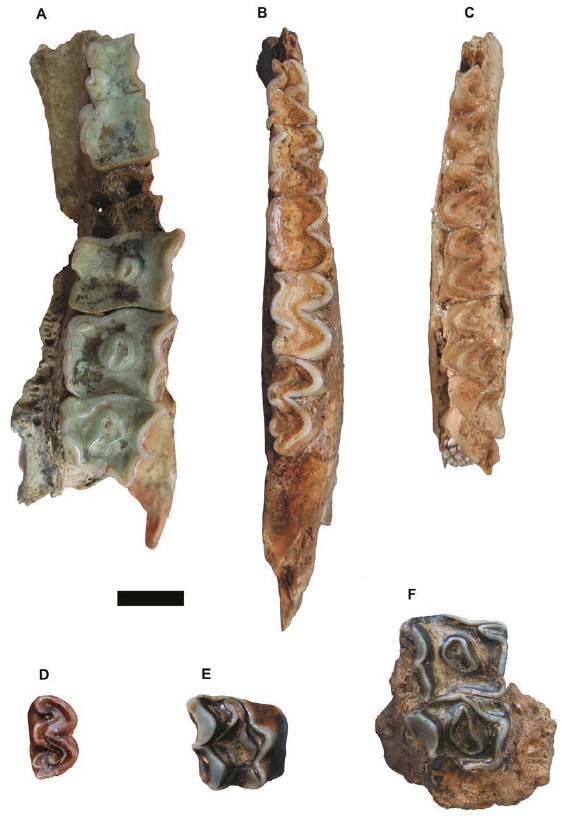
Teeth of N. recens, Sopas Formation

Neolicaphrium was a proterotherid of small (N. recens) to medium (N. major) size. In general terms, Neolicaphrium resembled Thoatherium of the Miocene, one of the most famous proterotherids, by its relatively graceful build adapted to a cursorial locomotion, although without presenting the extreme monodactyly that characterizes Thoatherium, so that still retained its three fingers in each hand and foot.

N. recens has been calculated to have had a body mass of 28.76298 ± 10.6412 kg, 27.78496 ± 8.0576 kg, or 26.72 ± 10.42 kg depending on the exact methodology used to derive the estimate.

The composition of the fauna of the Sopas Formation in Uruguay, where fossils of N. recens from the late Pleistocene have been found, indicates that Neolicaphrium was a resident of savannas and open tree forests. The rocks of the Sopas Formation were deposited in a gallery forest with rivers and Neolicaphrium lived there along with other mammals such as tapirs, the white-lipped peccary, the prehensile tail porcupine Coendou magnus, the capybara, the jaguar, and the otter, species that characterize the tropical forest areas of South America.

== Classification ==
The genus Neolicaphrium was first described in 1921 by Frenguelli, based on incomplete remains found in Argentina. The type species, Neolicaphrium recens, is typical of Upper Pliocene - Upper Pleistocene deposits of Argentina, Uruguay and Brazil, while the species N. major was found in Pliocene soils of Argentina.

Neolicaphrium is the last of the proterotheres, a group of litoptern mammals with shapes similar to equids, particularly with regard to leg structure. Neolicaphrium, in any case, was not the most specialized proterothere.

== Palaeoecology ==
The dental microwear patterns of N. recens clearly indicate that it was a herbivorous browser. It would have consumed the stems and buds of shrubs and trees as well as fed on fleshy leaves. Analysis of its δ^{13}C and δ^{18}O values has likewise revealed that N. recens was a browsing herbivore, bearing similarities in dietary ecology to the smaller cervids of today, such as the pudus, the pampas deer and the muntjac. The isotopic analysis of the fossils provides evidence that the species fed primarily on fruits and to a lesser extent on terrestrial plants that grew at ground level, and that leaves were only a very limited part of their diet.

== Extinction ==
Previously it was thought that the family Proterotheriidae became extinct during the Pliocene, as a consequence of the climatic changes that occurred in the transition to the Pleistocene, along with the pachyrukhine notoungulates and the argyrolagid metatherians. The fossil record of N. recens however, showed that this group survived until the Late Pleistocene in forested areas, outside the typical Pampa regions of the Southern Cone that were predominant during the Quaternary ice ages; However, this idea was rejected until the 21st century, when the new fossil finds allowed to corroborate its presence in the Pleistocene. In the Sopas Formation have been found also fossils of several types of deer (Pampas deer and an extinct form). Neolicaphrium therefore coexisted throughout the Pleistocene with ungulate mammals of holarctic origin. Both competition with these animals, which reached South America during the Great American Biotic Interchange, and the environmental changes occurring since the end of the Miocene, which led to the disappearance of forest areas, may have contributed the decline and extinction of proterotherids.

== Gallery ==
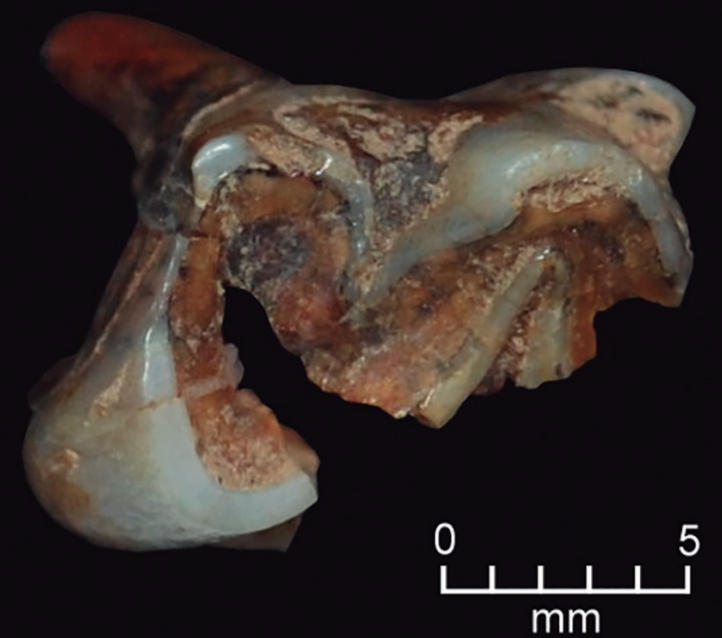
M2 molar of N. recens

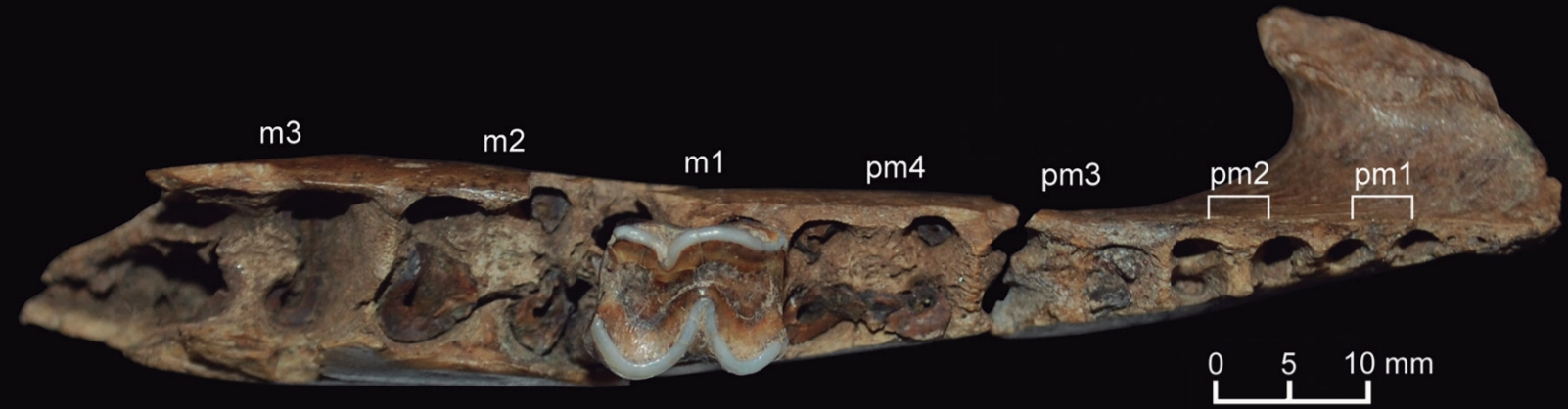
Right hemimandible of N. recens

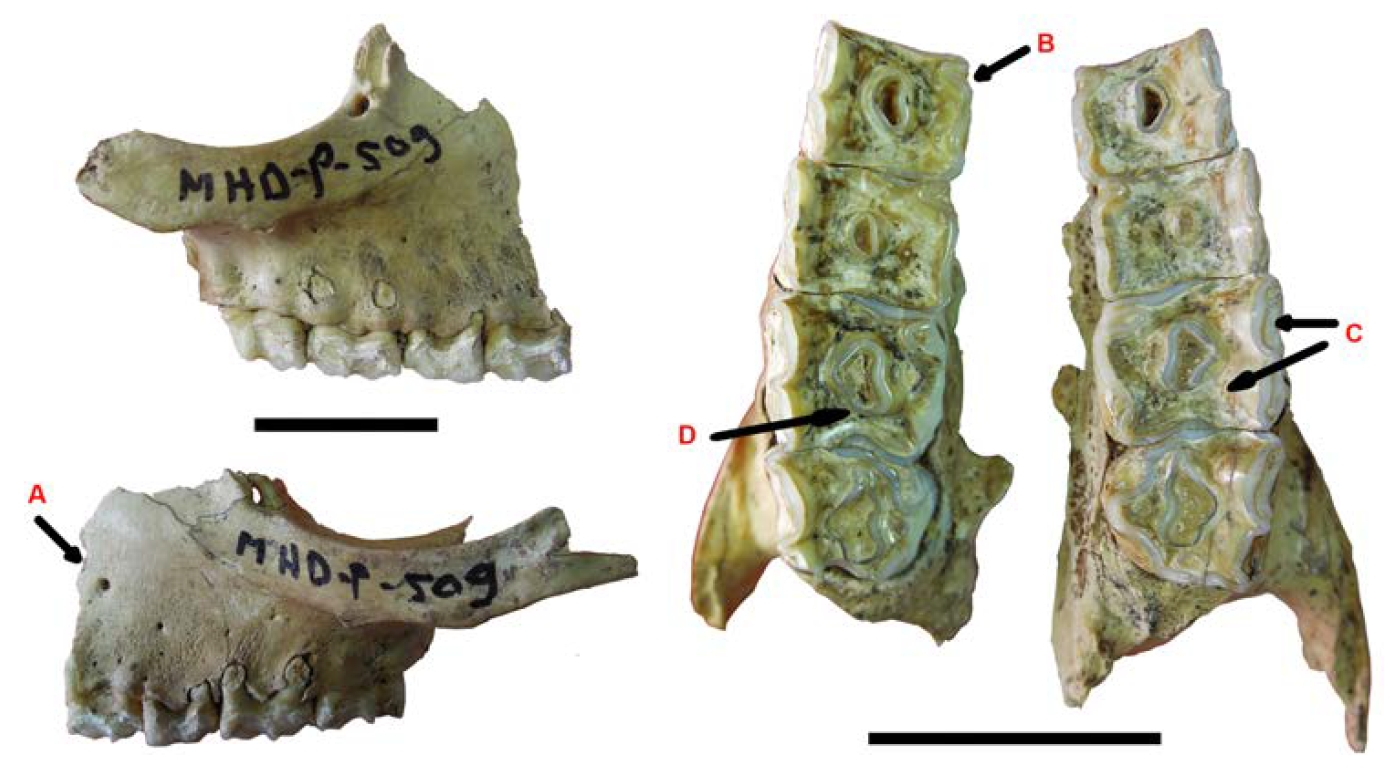
Mandible of N. recens, Sopas Formation
