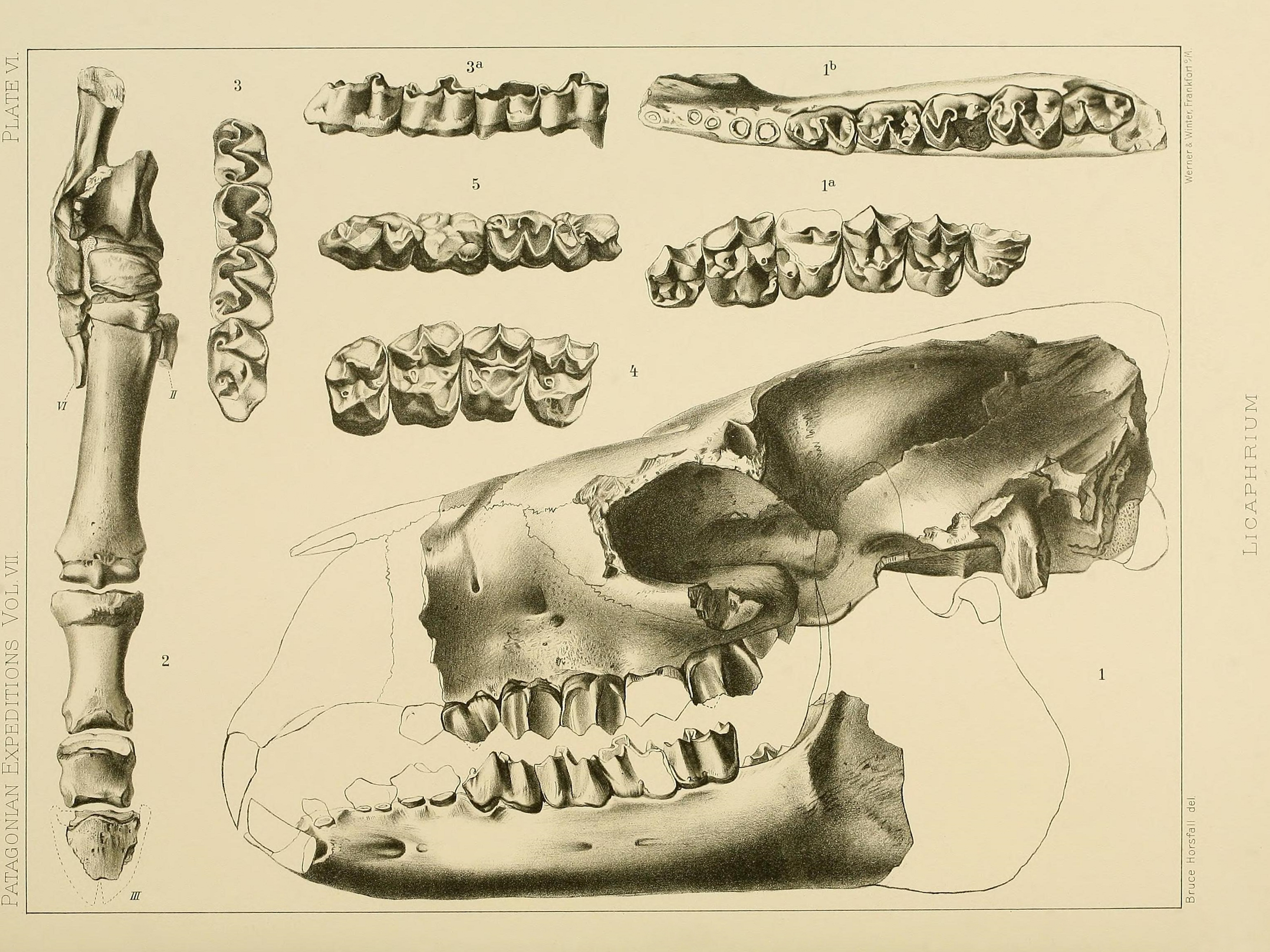

Scientific classification
- Kingdom: Animalia
- Phylum: Chordata
- Class: Mammalia
- Order: †Litopterna
- Family: †Proterotheriidae
- Subfamily: †Proterotheriinae
- Genus: †Anisolophus; Burmeister, 1885

Type species
- †Anchitherium australe Burmeister, 1879

Species
- Anisolophus australis (Burmeister, 1879); Anisolophus floweri (Ameghino, 1887); Anisolophus minisculus (Roth, 1899)

Synonyms
- Genus synonymy: Licaphrium Ameghino, 1887; A. australis: Anchitherium australe Burmeister, 1879; Proterotherium australe Ameghino, 1887; Proterotherium intermedium Ameghino, 1894; A. floweri: Licaphrium floweri Ameghino, 1887; Licaphrium granatum Ameghino, 1894; Licaphrium pyramidatum Ameghino, 1904; Licaphrium proximum Ameghino, 1904; Licaphrium pyneanum Scott, 1910; A. minisculus: Diadiaphorus minisculus Roth, 1899; Proterotherium dichotomum Ameghino, 1904; Licaphrops coalescens Ameghino, 1904

= Anisolophus =

Anisolophus Temporal range: Early Miocene-Middle Miocene (Santacrucian-Colloncuran) ~17.5–15.5 Ma

Extinct genus of litopterns

Anisolophus is an extinct genus of proterotheriid from the Early to Middle Miocene of Argentina. The genus was named by Burmeister in 1885 to accommodate the species Anchitherium australe, which they had named earlier in 1879. Soria then referred the species Licaphrium floweri and Anisolophus minisculus to the genus, making Licaphrium, named in 1887 by Florentino Ameghino, a junior synonym of the genus. Both A. australis and A. floweri are known from the Santacrucian age Santa Cruz Formation, while A. minisculus is known from the Collón Curá Formation.

Anisolophus is considered the senior synonym of the genus Licaphrium, which was named in 1887 by Ameghino for the species L. floweri, now A. floweri. Many other species of Licaphrium were named, many of which are considered synonyms of A. floweri, Tetramerorhinus, Neobrachytherium, or Lophogonodon, as well as the dubious Licaphrium debile, L. arenarum, L. intermissum, L. parvulum. Two invalid species of Anisolophus are known, A. fischeri, and A. acer, which are both dubious and also known as Diaphragmodon fischeri or Heptaconus acer.
