= Montehermosan =

Period of geologic time

- 6.8 – 4.0 Ma

Usage information
- Celestial body: Earth
- Regional usage: Regional
- Time scale(s) used: South American

Definition
- Chronological unit: Age
- Stratigraphic unit: Stage

The Montehermosan age is a period of geologic time (6.8–4.0 Ma) within the Miocene and Pliocene epochs of the Neogene used more specifically with South American Land Mammal Ages. It follows the Huayquerian and precedes the Chapadmalalan age.
