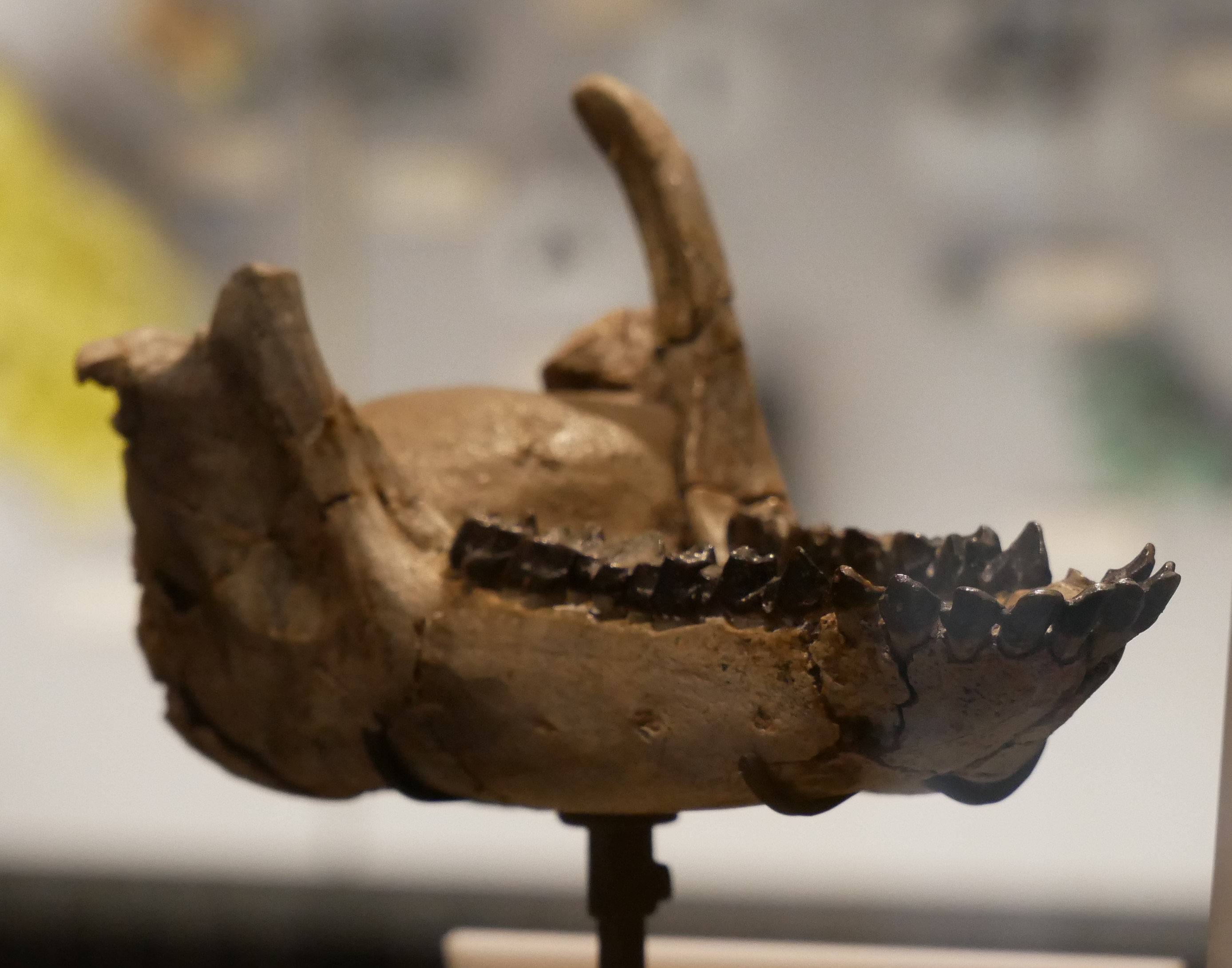
- Mandible of Protheosodon coniferus

Scientific classification
- Domain: Eukaryota
- Kingdom: Animalia
- Phylum: Chordata
- Class: Mammalia
- Order: †Litopterna
- Family: †Proterotheriidae
- Genus: †Protheosodon; Ameghino 1897
- Species: †P. coniferus

Binomial name
- †Protheosodon coniferus Ameghino, 1897

= Protheosodon =

Protheosodon Temporal range: Late Oligocene-Early Miocene (Deseadan-Colhuehuapian) ~28–21 Ma

Extinct genus of ungulate from South America

Protheosodon is an extinct genus of proterotheriid litoptern. It lived from the Late Oligocene to the Early Miocene in what is now Argentina and Colombia.

== Description ==
It was a medium-sized animal, smaller than the extant vicuña. The lower incisors, unlike those of more derived proterotheriids such as Diadiaphorus, were relatively small and unspecialized. The lower dentition was complete and there was no trace of diastema. The upper teeth were similar to those of Anisolambda and Polymorphis. The mandible had a very high vertical branch. Its leg bones, firstly attributed to a notoungulate, are incompletely known.

== Classification ==
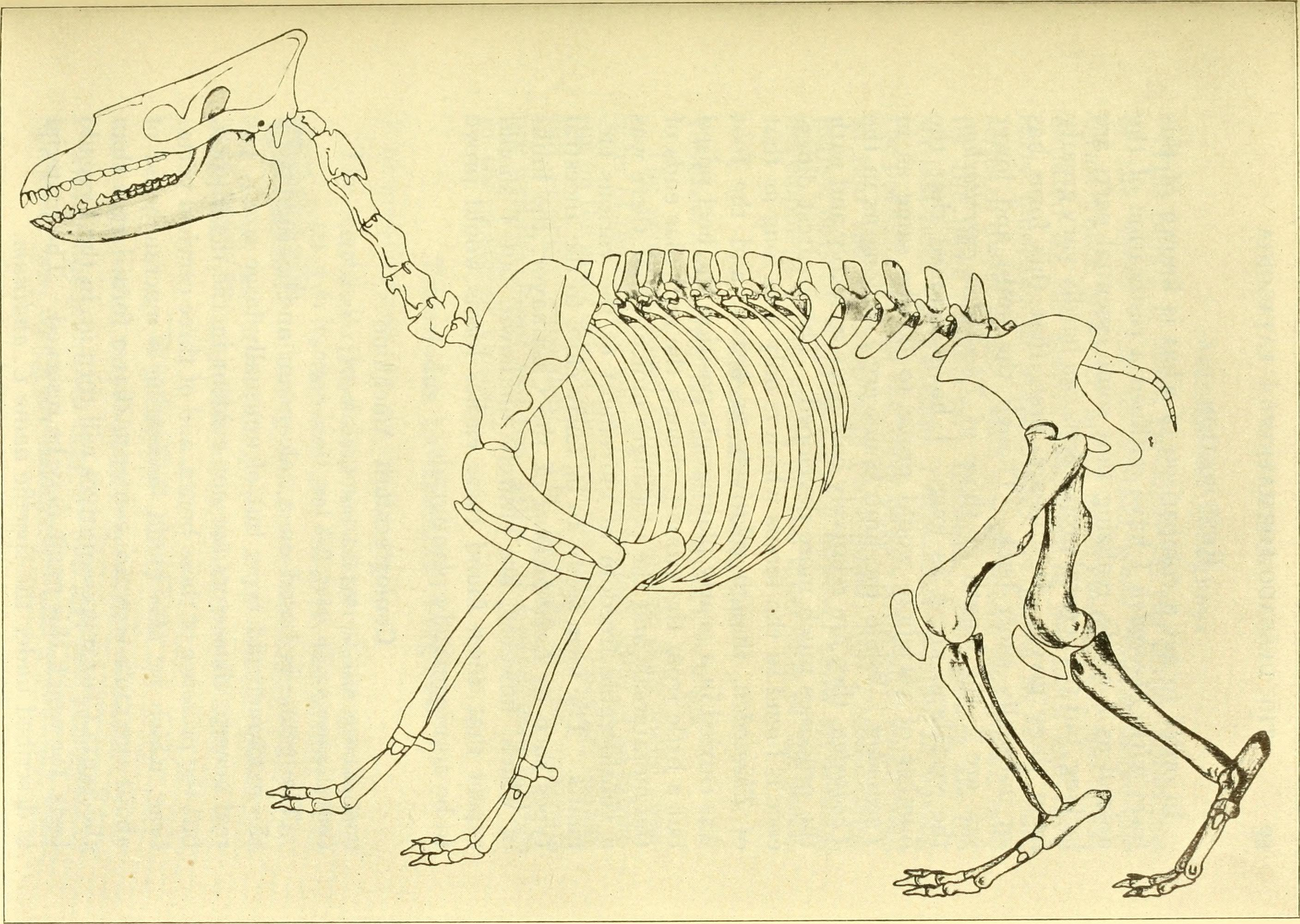
Outdated reconstruction of Protheosodon by Frederic Loomis, combining its scarce remains with a now outdated assumed affinity with the macraucheniid Theosodon.

Protheosodon coniferus was first described in 1897 by Florentino Ameghino, based on fossils found in Deseadan deposits from Chubut Province, Argentina. Other fossils attributed to the genus have been found in slightly older deposits in Colombia.

Protheosodon was initially thought to be a member of Macraucheniidae, mainly based on characteristics from its lower teeth. Subsequent researches has indicated that it was more probably nested within Proterotheriidae, a group of litopterns which, in the course of their evolution, developed horse-like forms, well adapted for running. It may have been a member of Anisolambdinae, the most basal subfamily of proterotheriids. Protheosodon seems to have been part of a collateral branch, contemporary to other, more derived, proterotheriids.

== Bibliography ==
- F. Ameghino. 1897. Mamiferos Cretaceos de la Argentina. Segunda contribucion al conocimiento de la fauna mastologica de las capas con restos de Pyrotherium. Boletin Instituto Geografico Argentino 18:406-521
