= Bounodus =

Bounodus Temporal range: Late Miocene (Mayoan) ~11.6 Ma

Scientific classification
- Kingdom: Animalia
- Phylum: Chordata
- Class: Mammalia
- Order: †Litopterna
- Family: †Proterotheriidae
- Genus: †Bounodus; McKenna 1956
- Species: †B. enigmaticus

Binomial name
- †Bounodus enigmaticus Carlini, Gelfo & Sanchez 2006

Extinct genus of litopterns

Bounodus is an extinct genus of ungulates native from South America, belonging to the order Litopterna. Its remains were found in Miocene rocks from the Urumaco Formation of northern Venezuela. The genus is only known from its holotype, AMU-CURS 44, a fragmentary right maxilla preserving teeth from the fourth premolar to the third molar and the alveolus of the third premolar, exhibiting a typical bunodont structure in the animal dentition, a characteristic shared with its close relative Megadolodus. The postcranial skeleton of the genus is unknown. Its dentition indicates that the animal was omnivorous, with teeth adapted to potentially eat shelled fruits, as well as the molluscs and crustaceans that thrived in the wetlands that covered most of North-West South America, including the Urumaco Formation, during the Neogene.

The genus name, Bounodus, is composed of the Greek prefix Bouno-, meaning "hill", and the Greek suffix -odus, meaning tooth, in allusion to the bunodont dentition, characteristic of the genus. The species name, enigmaticus, was given in regard of its stockier morphology than most litopterns.
