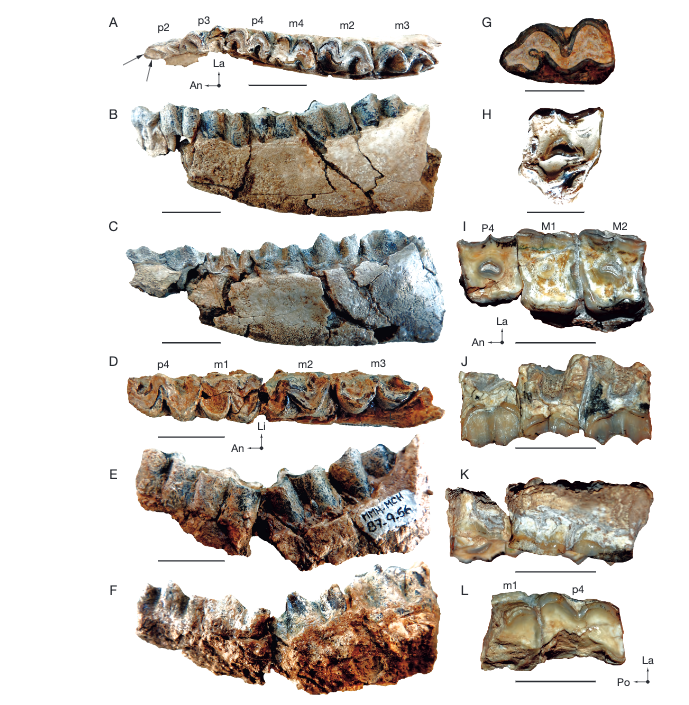
- Fossils of Diplasiotherium pampa, from the Cerro Azul Formation

Scientific classification
- Kingdom: Animalia
- Phylum: Chordata
- Class: Mammalia
- Order: †Litopterna
- Family: †Proterotheriidae
- Subfamily: †Proterotheriinae
- Genus: †Diplasiotherium; Rovereto, 1914

Type species
- †Diplasiotherium robustum Rovereto 1914

Species
- D. pampa Soria 2001; D. robustum Rovereto 1914 (type)

= Diplasiotherium =

Diplasiotherium Temporal range: Late Miocene-Early Pliocene (Huayquerian-Montehermosan) ~7–4 Ma

Extinct genus of litopterns

Diplasiotherium is an extinct genus of litoptern belonging to the family Proterotheriidae, that lived between the late Miocene and the early Pliocene (in the SALMAs Huayquerian and Montehermosan). The fossils of this animal have been found in Argentina, in the Monte Hermoso Formation.

Diplasiotherium is distinguished from other proterotheriids by the crown of its molars, which were higher than in other related genera (protohypsodont), and by its larger body size; the species D. robustum reached approximately 395 kilograms (871 lb) in weight, making it the largest known proterotheriid.
