= Paranisolambda =

Paranisolambda Temporal range: Early Eocene-Middle Eocene (Riochican-Casamayoran) ~55.8–48.6 Ma

Scientific classification
- Kingdom: Animalia
- Phylum: Chordata
- Class: Mammalia
- Order: †Litopterna
- Family: †Proterotheriidae
- Subfamily: †Anisolambdinae
- Genus: †Paranisolambda; Cifelli, 1983
- Species: †P. prodromus

Binomial name
- †Paranisolambda prodromus Paula Couto (1952)

Synonyms
- Anisolambda prodromus Paula Couto, (1952)

Extinct genus of litopterns

Paranisolambda is an extinct genus of proterotheriid litopterns from the Early to Middle Eocene of Brazil. Fossils of Paranisolambda have been recovered from the Itaboraí Formation in the Brazilian state of Rio de Janeiro.

== Etymology ==
The genus name, Paranisolambda, is derived from the Greek para/παρα meaning "beside" or "near", and its close relative Anisolambda, the genus it was originally assigned to. The specific name, "prodromus" is derived from the Greek word prodromos, meaning "forerunner".

== History ==
The first remains of Paranisolambda were found in the Sāo José De Itaboraí Basin in 1948, consisting of the right mandible of a young individual as the holotype.
