= Lambdaconus =

Lambdaconus Temporal range: Late Oligocene-Early Miocene (Deseadan-Colhuehuapian) ~29.0–17.5 Ma

Scientific classification
- Kingdom: Animalia
- Phylum: Chordata
- Class: Mammalia
- Order: †Litopterna
- Family: †Proterotheriidae
- Subfamily: †Proterotheriinae
- Genus: †Lambdaconus; Ameghino, 1897

Type species
- †Lambdaconus suinus Ameghino, 1897

Other species
- Lambdaconus lacerum (Ameghino, 1902); Lambdaconus inaequifacies (Ameghino, 1904)

Synonyms
- Genus synonymy: Prothoatherium Ameghino, 1902; Eoproterotherium Ameghino, 1904; Licaphrops Ameghino, 1904; L. lacerum: Prothoatherium lacerum Ameghino, 1902; Prolicaphrium festinus Ameghino, 1902; Licaphrops festinus (Ameghino, 1902) Ameghino, 1904; L. inaqeuifacies: Eoproterotherium inaequifacies Ameghino, 1904

Extinct genus of litopterns

Lambdaconus is a genus of proterotheriid from the Late Oligocene to Early Miocene of Argentina. The type species (main species) of Lambdaconus genus is L. suinus. It was named in 1897 by Ameghino. The referred species include L. lacerum, named as Proterotherium lacerum in 1902 by Ameghino, and L. inaqeuifacies.
