= Picturotherium =

Picturotherium Temporal range: Miocene

Scientific classification
- Domain: Eukaryota
- Kingdom: Animalia
- Phylum: Chordata
- Class: Mammalia
- Order: †Litopterna
- Family: †Proterotheriidae
- Genus: †Picturotherium; Kramarz & Bond, 2005
- Species: †P. migueli

Binomial name
- †Picturotherium migueli Kramarz & Bond, 2005

Extinct genus of litopterns

Picturotherium is a genus of extinct proterotheriid from the middle Miocene of Santa Cruz, Argentina. The genus is known from the type and only species P. migueli, named in 2005 by Alejandro Kramarz and Mariano Bond for individual teeth from the Pinturas Formation. Picturotherium is derived from the Latin for the Rio Pinturas and the word "beast", with the species name honouring South American paleontologist Miguel Soria.
