= Epitherium =

Epitherium Temporal range: Pliocene ~6.8–4 Ma

Scientific classification
- Kingdom: Animalia
- Phylum: Chordata
- Class: Mammalia
- Order: †Litopterna
- Family: †Proterotheriidae
- Subfamily: †Proterotheriinae
- Genus: †Epitherium; Ameghino 1888

Type species
- †Epitherium laternarium Ameghino, 1888

Species
- E. laternarium Ameghino 1894

Extinct genus of litopterns

Epitherium is an extinct genus of Litopterna, who belonged to the family Proterotheriidae. It lived during the Pliocene in South America. The fossils of this herbivorous ungulate were found in Argentina.
