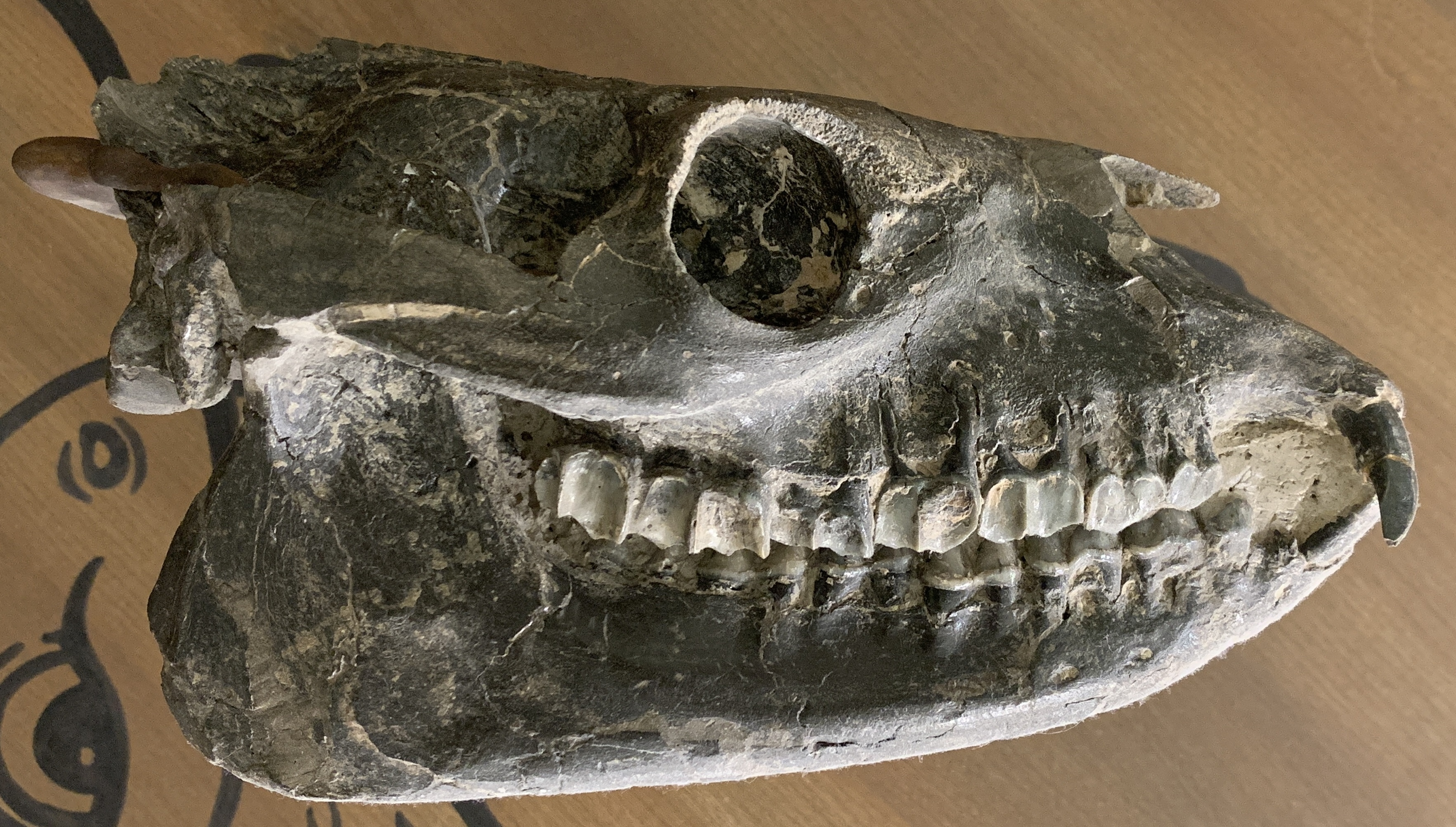
- D. majusculus skull. Collected from Santa Cruz, Patagonia, Argentina.

Scientific classification
- Kingdom: Animalia
- Phylum: Chordata
- Class: Mammalia
- Order: †Litopterna
- Family: †Proterotheriidae
- Subfamily: †Proterotheriinae
- Genus: †Diadiaphorus; Ameghino, 1887

Type species
- †Diadiaphorus majusculus Ameghino, 1887

Species
- D. caniadensis; D. majusculus Ameghino, 1887; D. paranensis; D. sanctaecrucis; D. velox

Synonyms
- Genus synonymy: Bunodontherium Mercerat, 1891; D. majusculus: Bunodontherium majusculum Mercerat, 1891; Diadiaphorus diplinthus Ameghino, 1894; Diadiaphorus robustus Ameghino, 1894; Diadiaphorus coelops Ameghino, 1904

= Diadiaphorus =

Diadiaphorus Temporal range: Early-Late Miocene (Santacrucian-Huayquerian) ~17.5–6.8 Ma

Extinct genus of litopterns

Diadiaphorus is an extinct genus of litoptern mammal from the Miocene of Argentina (Ituzaingó, Pinturas, Chiquimil and Santa Cruz Formations) and Bolivia (Nazareno Formation), South America.

== Description ==
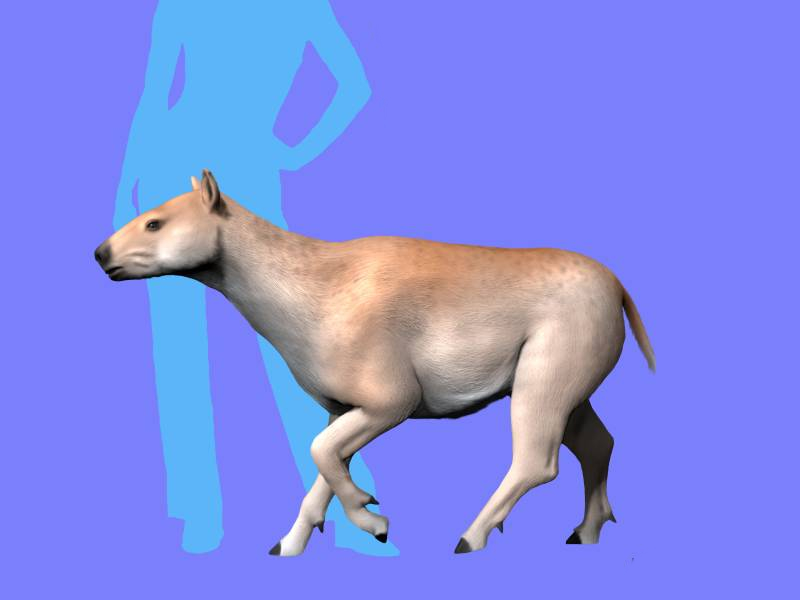
Size comparison between a human and D. majusculus.

Diadiaphorus closely resembled a horse, but was only around 1.2 metres (3.9 ft) in body length with a weight 70 kilograms (150 lb), similar to a modern sheep.

It had three toes, only one of which touched the ground. This toe had a large hoof derived from the median digit, the two outer toes were rudimentary, much like those of early horses such as Merychippus. Unlike horses, however, Diadiaphorus lacked fused limb bones. Its skull was short and had a relatively large brain cavity. The neck of Diadiaphorus was shortened as well. Judging from its low molars, Diadiaphorus ate soft vegetation, such as leaves. Diadiaphorus had brachyodont teeth, and the second upper and third lower incisors formed a set of pseudo-tusks. The upper molars of Diadiaphorus had two crescentic outer cusps which met in a vertical ridge. The dental formula is 1,0,4,32,1,4,3 × 2 = 36.

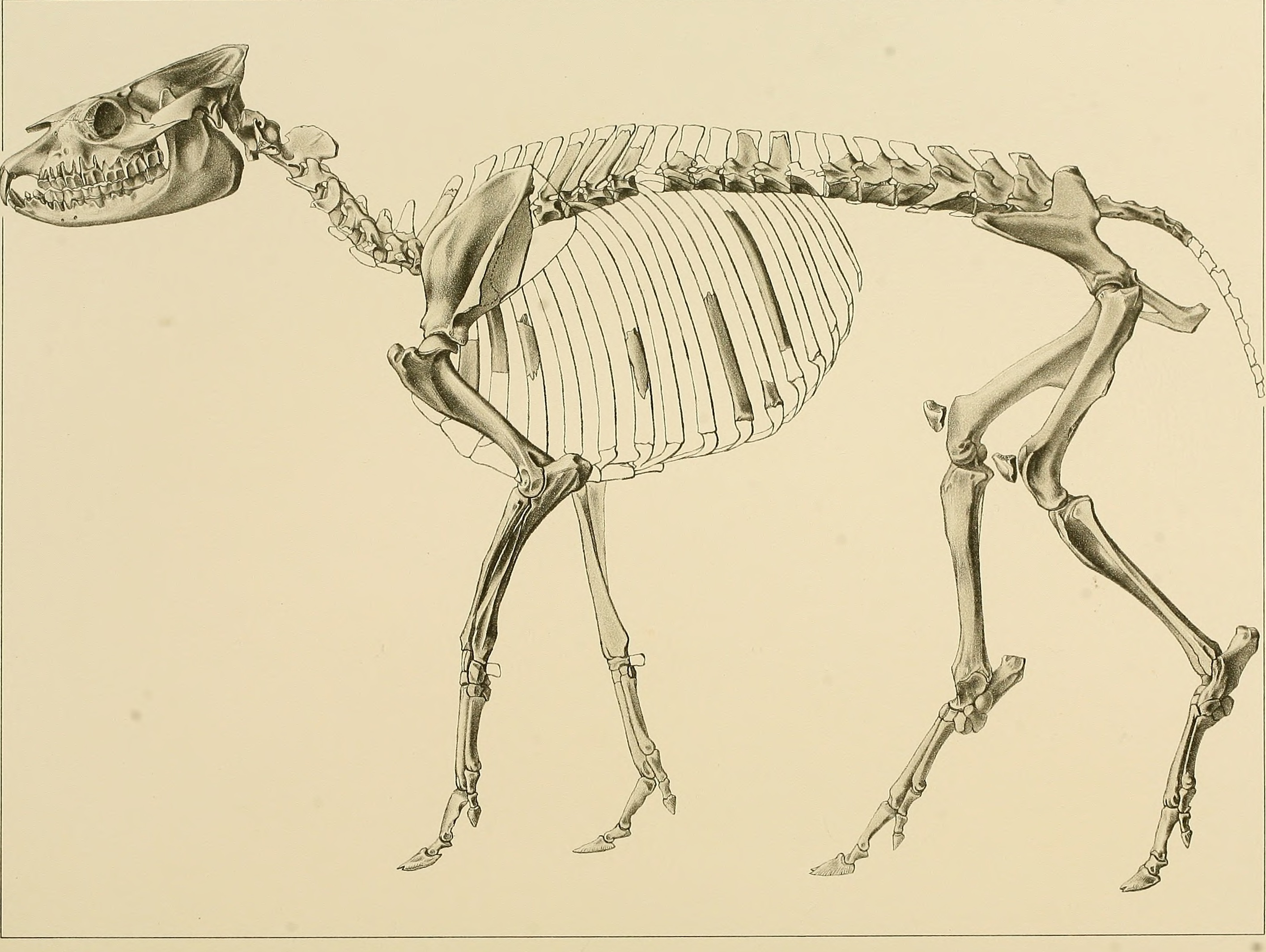
1901 skeletal illustration of D. majusculus, mostly based on bones from two separate individuals.

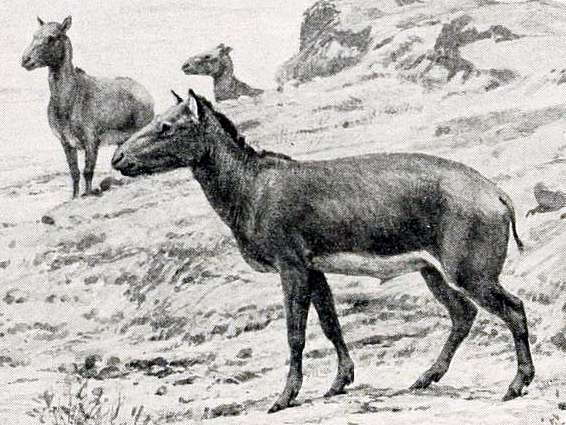
1913 illustration of D. majusculus by Charles R. Knight.
