= Antarctodon =

Antarctodon Temporal range: Early Eocene-Late Eocene (Itaboraian-Divisaderan) ~48.6–37.2 Ma

Scientific classification
- Kingdom: Animalia
- Phylum: Chordata
- Class: Mammalia
- Order: †Astrapotheria
- Genus: †Antarctodon; M. Bond et al. 2011
- Species: †A. sobrali

Binomial name
- †Antarctodon sobrali M. Bond et al. 2011

Extinct genus of mammals

Antarctodon is an extinct genus of mammals from the Early Eocene (late Ypresian age). It is a basal astrapotherian which lived in what is now Seymour Island, Antarctic Peninsula, at that moment still connected to South America where most of the astrapotherians were found. The holotype and only specimen MLP 08-XI-30-1, an isolated right p4 or m1, was found in the Telm 5 Member of the La Meseta Formation in West Antarctica. It was first named by Mariano Bond, Alejandro Kramarz, Ross D. E. MacPhee and Marcelo Reguero in 2011 and the type species is Antarctodon sobrali.

== Phylogeny ==
Cladogram after M. Bond et al. 2011:

- Astrapotheria
  - Eoastrapostylops
  - - Trigonostylops
    - - Tetragonostylops
      - - Antarctodon
        - - Albertogaudrya
          - - Scaglia
            - Astrapotheriidae
              - Astraponotus
              - - Maddenia
                - - Parastrapotherium
                  - - Astrapotherium
                    - Granastrapotherium
