= Uruguaytherium =

Uruguaytherium Temporal range: Late Oligocene-Early Miocene (Deseadan) ~29.0–21.0 Ma

Scientific classification
- Kingdom: Animalia
- Phylum: Chordata
- Class: Mammalia
- Order: †Astrapotheria
- Family: †Astrapotheriidae
- Subfamily: †Uruguaytheriinae
- Genus: †Uruguaytherium; Kraglievich, 1928

Type species
- Uruguaytherium beaulieui Kraglievich, 1928

Extinct family of mammals

Uruguaytherium is an extinct genus of astrapotherid mammal from the Late Oligocene to Early Miocene of South America. It was named by the Argentinean paleontologist Lucas Kraglievich in 1928, from a fragmentary fossil found in the Fray Bentos Formation of the department of Río Negro in Uruguay, and the type and only is U. beaulieui. The related genera Xenastrapotherium and Granastrapotherium, which make up Uruguaytheriinae with Uruguaytherium, are also from South America, although them colonizated the equatorial zone. The holotype specimen of Uruguaytherium is a partial mandible (the left mandibular ramus), with a preserved third molar, or M^{3}.

== Phylogeny ==
Cladogram based in the phylogenetic analysis published by Vallejo-Pareja et al., 2015, showing the position of Uruguaytherium:

- Eoastrapostylops
- - Trigonostylops
  - - Tetragonostylops
    - - Albertogaudrya
      - - Scaglia
        - - Astraponotus
          - - Maddenia
            - - Comahuetherium
              - - Parastrapotherium
                - - Astrapotheriinae
                    - Astrapotherium
                    - Astrapothericulus
                  - Uruguaytheriinae
                    - Uruguaytherium
                    - - - Hilarcotherium
                        - Xenastrapotherium
                      - Granastrapotherium
