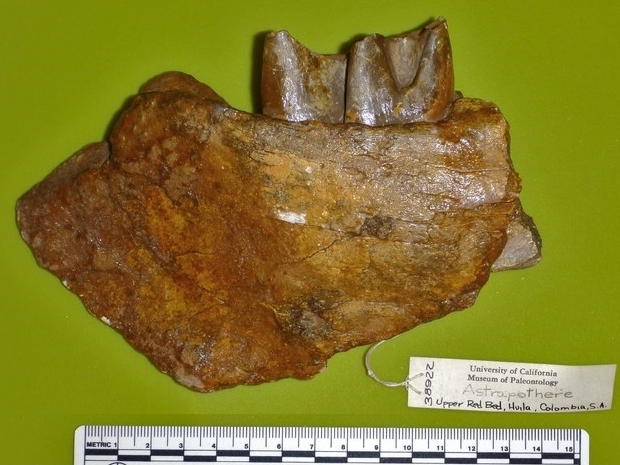
- Mandible of X. kraglievichi, Honda Group, Colombia

Scientific classification
- Kingdom: Animalia
- Phylum: Chordata
- Class: Mammalia
- Order: †Astrapotheria
- Family: †Astrapotheriidae
- Subfamily: †Uruguaytheriinae
- Genus: †Xenastrapotherium; Kraglievich, 1928

Type species
- †Xenastrapotherium christi (Stelin, 1928)

Species
- See text

Synonyms
- †Astrapotherium christi Stehlin 1928; †Synastrapotherium Paula Couto 1976

= Xenastrapotherium =

Xenastrapotherium Temporal range: Mid-Late Miocene (Friasian-Huayquerian) ~16–6.8 Ma

Extinct genus of astrapothere

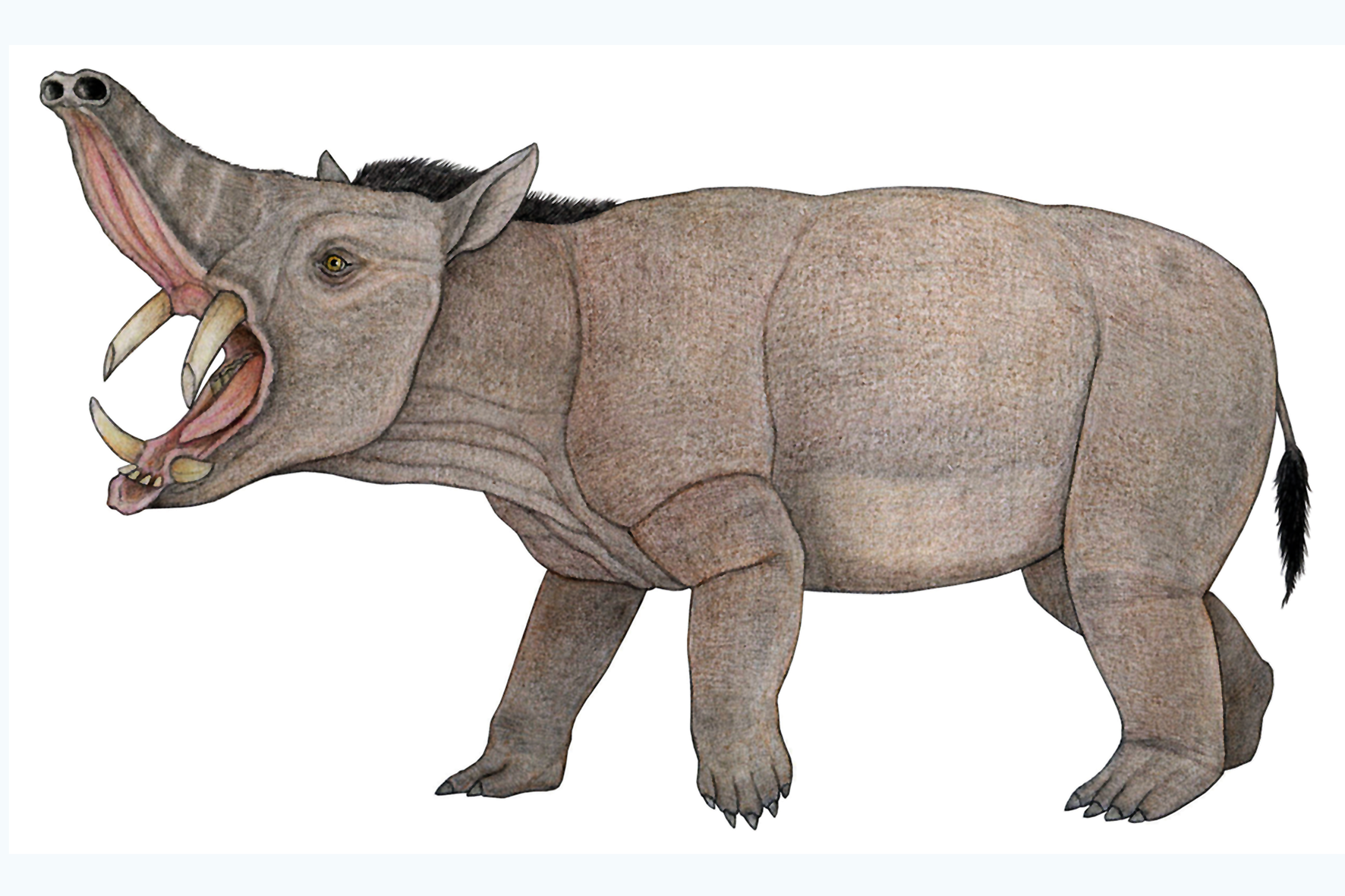
Paleoart of Xenastrapotherium christi. Artwork by Edwin Chávez "Disfrasaurio".

Xenastrapotherium is an extinct genus of astrapothere, a type of hoofed herbivorous mammal, native to South America, which lived in the Middle to Late Miocene period, typically during the Laventan stage. It is a member of the family Astrapotheriidae in the subfamily Uruguaytheriinae, large astrapotheres, equipped with a trunk-like nose and protruding teeth, similar to the elephants, but their tusks were the canine teeth, not the incisors. Xenastrapotherium (named after the Greek word xenos "strange" add to the genus Astrapotherium, "lightning beast") was a genus widely distributed in northern South America, in contrast to other species of astrapotheres which lived in the area of the Southern Cone of the continent. It differed from other astrapotheres by having two lower incisors on each side of the jaw and the tusks have a pronounced longitudinal curvature, although their general shape and size are probably very similar to Astrapotherium, whose weight would be 900 to 1,500 kilograms, comparable to the current black rhinoceros.

== Species ==
Several species of Xenastrapotherium have been described, although none is known from complete remains; they are distinguished by features of their teeth and jaws, and their geographical and temporal distribution. The species currently recognized are:

- X. christi Stehlin 1929: the first known species, originally classified by Stehlin (1929) as Astrapotherium christi, and later reclassified to the current genus. It was found in Venezuela near Zaraza in the state of Guarico, based on a full lower jaw.
- X. kraglievichi Cabrera 1929: based on several teeth and some jaws, discovered in the area of La Venta (Group Honda, Villavieja Formation) in the department of Huila, Colombia, dating from the middle Miocene, about 13 to 11 million years. Distinguished by their lower tusks, which were more horizontal and rounded in cross-section. This species was contemporary with its great relative, Granastrapotherium.
- X. aequatorialis Johnson & Madden 1997: Based on a piece of right lower jaw, found in the river Burgaya in the province of Cañar, Ecuador, in the Biblián Formation (Middle Miocene, 19 million years ago). It is distinguished by its molar with buccal and labial cingulum, and the first molar was lophodont and had roots. This species is older than the fossils of La Venta, contemporary with Astrapotheriinae like Astrapotherium, Astrapothericulus and Parastrapotherium.
- X. chaparralensis Johnson & Madden 1997: Another species known from Colombia, was found near to Chaparral in department of Tolima, in the Tuné Formation (early Miocene). It is distinguished by its greater molar area, a high molar buccal cingulum, with canines very similar to those of X. kraglievichi.
- X. amazonense Paula Couto 1976: Based on jaw fragments found in the vicinity of the river Breu, Pedra Pintada, Brazil, also found in the Fitzcarrald Arch in Peru. It is distinguished by the large size of the third molar, compared to other species of Xenastrapotherium. It was classified originally in its own genus, Synastrapotherium. A tusk assigned to this species was found in the zone of Acre in Brazil, in deposits from the late Miocene, which make it the most recent record for the astrapotheres; but this idea has been challenged, since the fossil could not be from an astrapothere.

== Phylogeny ==
Cladogram based in the phylogenetic analysis published by Vallejo Pareja et al., 2015, showing the position of Xenastrapotherium:

- Eoastrapostylops
- - Trigonostylops
  - - Tetragonostylops
    - - Albertogaudrya
      - - Scaglia
        - - Astraponotus
          - - Maddenia
            - - Comahuetherium
              - - Parastrapotherium
                - - Astrapotheriinae
                    - Astrapotherium
                    - Astrapothericulus
                  - Uruguaytheriinae
                    - Uruguaytherium
                    - - - Hilarcotherium
                        - Xenastrapotherium
                      - Granastrapotherium

== Distribution ==
Xenastrapotherium fossil locations
Honda Group, Colombia
Biblián Formation
Ipururo Formation
Solimões Formation
Honda Group, Bolivia

Fossils of Xenastrapotherium have been found in:

- Honda Group, Colombia
- Biblián Formation, Ecuador
- Ipururo Formation, Peru
- Solimões Formation, Brazil
- Honda Group, Bolivia
