= 1997 in paleontology =

Paleontology or palaeontology is the study of prehistoric life forms on Earth through the examination of plant and animal fossils. This includes the study of body fossils, tracks (ichnites), burrows, cast-off parts, fossilised feces (coprolites), palynomorphs and chemical residues. Because humans have encountered fossils for millennia, paleontology has a long history both before and after becoming formalized as a science. This article records significant discoveries and events related to paleontology that occurred or were published in the year 1997.

== Plants ==
=== Cycadophytes ===
==== Cycadophyte research ====
- Hopkins and Johnson briefly report the first occurrence of cycad leaves from the Eocene Okanagan Highlands Klondike Mountain Formation which will later be identified to the family Zamiaceae.

=== Angiosperms ===
Name	Novelty	Status	Authors	Age	Unit	Location	Notes	Images
Eucommia jeffersonensis	Sp nov	valid	Call & Dilcher	Late Eocene	John Day Formation	USA	Species of Eucommia.	
Eucommia rolandii	Sp nov	valid	Call & Dilcher	Middle Eocene	Talahatta Formation	USA; Mississippi	Species of Eucommia. Also identified from the Coldwater Beds, British Columbia	

== Fungi ==
Name	Novelty	Status	Authors	Age	Unit	Location	Notes	Images
Archaeomarasmius	Gen et sp nov	Valid	Hibbett, Grimaldi, & Donoghue	Cretaceous; Turonian	New Jersey amber.	USA	A tricholomataceous fungi	Archaeomarasmius leggetti
Protomycena	Gen et sp nov	Valid	Hibbett, Grimaldi, & Donoghue	Miocene; Burdigalian	Dominican amber	Dominican Republic	A mycenaceous fungi	Protomycena electra

=== Paleomycological research ===
- LePage et al briefly describe the first instance of ectomycorrhizae in the fossil record, based on specimens from the Eocene Okanagan Highlands Princeton chert site. The fungi are associated with Pinus roots and were considered similar to the modern fungal genera Rhizopogon and Suillus

== Arthropoda ==
=== Insects ===
Name	Novelty	Status	Authors	Age	Unit	Location	Notes	Images
Baikuris casei	Sp. nov	Valid	Grimaldi, Agosti, & Carpenter	Turonian	New Jersey amber	USA	An ant of uncertain subfamily placement. First identified as a sphecomyrmine ant	
Boyeria europaea	Comb nov	valid	(Nel, Arillo, & Martínez-Delclòs)	Messinian		France	An Aeshnid dragonfly.	Boyeria europaea
Brownimecia clavata	Gen et sp. nov	Valid	Grimaldi, Agosti, & Carpenter	Turonian	New Jersey amber	USA	A stem group ant, type species B. clavata	Brownimecia clavata
Ctenobethylus goepperti	Comb nov	valid	(Mayr, 1868)	Middle Eocene	Baltic amber	Europe	Fossil Dolichoderine ant, moved from Liometopum goepperti Senior synonym of Ctenobethylus succinalis	Ctenobethylus goepperti
Makarkinia adamsi	Gen et comb nov	jr synonym	Martins-Neto	Aptian	Crato Formation	Brazil	A Kalligrammatid lacewing, new genus for Panfilovia adamsi	
Makarkiniinae	Subfam nov	jr synonym	Martins-Neto	Aptian	Crato Formation	Brazil	lacewing subfamily, syn of Kalligrammatidae	

== Plesiosaurs ==
=== Newly Named Plesiosaurs ===
Currently Valid Plesiosaur Genera Named in 1997
Name	Status	Authors	Location	Images
Augustasaurus	Valid taxon	Sander; Rieppel Bucher	USA (Nevada)	Augustasauus
Libonectes	Valid taxon	Welles (as Elasmosaurus morgani in 1949); Carpenter (as Libonectes morgani in 1997)	Morocco; USA (Texas)	Libonectes
Maresaurus	Valid taxon	Gasparini	Argentina	Libonectes

== Archosauromorphs ==
=== Pseudosuchians ===
Name	Novelty	Status	Authors	Age	Type locality	Country	Notes	Images
"Baru" huberi	Sp. nov		Willis	Late Oligocene	White Hunter Site of the Riversleigh WHA	Australia	A mekosuchine crocodilian. Although named as a species of Baru, later research considers it to be a distinct genus.	
Baru wickeni	Sp. nov	Valid	Willis	Late Oligocene	White Hunter Site of the Riversleigh WHA	Australia	A mekosuchine crocodilian. It was established based on new material from the Riversleigh as well as material previously assigned to Baru darrowi.	
Mekosuchus whitehunterensis	Sp. nov	Valid	Willis	Late Oligocene	White Hunter Site of the Riversleigh WHA	Australia	A mekosuchine crocodilian. The first species of Mekosuchus to have been named from continental Australia.	
Pallimnarchus gracilis	Sp. nov	Valid	Willis & Molnar	Late Pleistocene	Terrace Site of the Riversleigh WHA	Australia	A mekosuchine crocodilian and species of Pallimnarchus, described as having been more gracile than Pallimnarchus pollens. The species is valid, but now placed in the genus Paludirex.	
Quinkana meboldi	Sp. nov	Valid	Willis	Late Oligocene	White Hunter Site of the Riversleigh WHA	Australia	A mekosuchine crocodilian. It was a smaller species of the genus Quinkana.	

==== General pseudosuchian research ====
- A review of Australasian fossil crocodilians is published by Willis (1997).

=== Pterosaurs ===
==== Newly Named Pterosaurs ====
Currently Valid Pterosaur Genera Named in 1997
Name	Status	Authors	Location	Images
Eosipterus	Valid taxon	Ji; Ji	China	

=== Non-avian dinosauromorphs ===
- Paleontologist Karen Chin received a coprolite that was excavated during 1995 from strata dating back to the Maastrichtian in Saskatchewan, Canada. The specimen was about 17 inches (44 cm) long and contained fragments of bone. Due to its size, contents and age, the coprolite was believed to have been the remains of Tyrannosaurus rex feces. This discovery was announced in a 1998 paper published in the journal Nature.
- A Saharan expedition under the leadership of Paul Sereno yielded fruit when a team member stumbled on the bones and skull of Nigersaurus taqueti. During this and a subsequent 1999 expedition about 80% of the animal's skeleton were discovered. Later in the year of the second expedition, a formal description of the animal was published.
- French paleontologist Philippe Taquet reported the finding of fossilized theropod embryos preserved in Portuguese dinosaur eggs. These eggs were from the Jurassic period dating to about 140 million years ago, nearly twice as old as any previously recovered dinosaur embryos, which had only been known from about 70 million years ago in Late Cretaceous strata.
- Psittacosaurus gastroliths documented.
- Panoplosaurus gastroliths documented.

==== Newly named non-avian dinosauromorphs ====
Data courtesy of George Olshevsky's dinosaur genera list.

Name	Status	Authors		Location	Notes	Images
Archaeoceratops	Valid taxon	Dong Zhiming	Azuma	China		Archaeoceratops Gojirasaurus Unenlagia
Gojirasaurus	Valid taxon	Kenneth Carpenter		USA(New Mexico)		Archaeoceratops Gojirasaurus Unenlagia
Hudiesaurus	Valid taxon	Dong Zhiming		China		Archaeoceratops Gojirasaurus Unenlagia
Protarchaeopteryx	Valid taxon	Ji Q.	Ji S.	China		Archaeoceratops Gojirasaurus Unenlagia
Rinchenia	Valid taxon	Rinchen Barsbold vide: Halszka Osmólska; Phillip Currie	Rinchen Barsbold			Archaeoceratops Gojirasaurus Unenlagia
Siluosaurus	Nomen dubium.	Dong Zhiming		China		Archaeoceratops Gojirasaurus Unenlagia
Unenlagia	Valid taxon	Novas	Puerta	Argentina		Archaeoceratops Gojirasaurus Unenlagia

=== Birds ===
==== Newly named birds ====
Name	Status	Novelty	Authors	Age	Unit	Location	Notes	Images
Aramus paludigrus	Sp. nov.	Valid	D. Tab Rasmussen	Miocene	Honda Group	Colombia	An Aramidae.	
Athene angelis	Sp. nov.	Valid	Cécile Mourer-Chauviré Michelle Salotti Elizabeth Pereira Yves Quinif Jean-Yves Courtois Jean-Noël Dubois Jean-Claude La Milza	Middle Pleistocene	Corsica	France: Corsica	A Strigidae.	
Cathayornis caudatus	Sp. nov.	Valid	Hou Lianhai	Early Cretaceous	Valanginian, Jiufotang Formation	China	A member of Enantiornithes Walker, 1981. Originally described as a species of Cathayornis; subsequently made the type species of a separate genus Houornis.	
Chauvireria balcanica	Gen. nov. et Sp. nov.	Valid	Zlatozar N. Boev	Late Pliocene	MN 17	Bulgaria	A Phasianidae.	
Confuciusornis chuonzhous	Sp. nov.	Valid ?	Hou Lianhai	Early Cretaceous	Lower Yixian Formation	China	A Confuciusornithidae Hou, Zhou, Gu et Zhang, 1995, possibly a synonym of Confuciusornis sanctus L. H. Hou, Zhou, Gu et Zhang, 1995.	
Confuciusornis suniae	Sp. nov.	Valid ?	Hou Lianhai	Early Cretaceous	Lower Yixian Formation	China	A Confuciusornithidae Hou, Zhou, Gu et Zhang, 1995, possibly a synonym of Confuciusornis sanctus L. H. Hou, Zhou, Gu et Zhang, 1995.	
Cuspirostrisornis houi	Gen. nov et Sp. nov.	Valid	Hou Lianhai	Early Cretaceous	Valanginian, Jiufotang Formation	China	An Enantiornithes Walker, 1981, Cuspirostrisornithidae Hou, 1997, this is the type species of the new genus.	
Eutreptodactylus itaboraiensis	Gen. nov. et Sp. nov.	Valid	Robert F. Baird Patricia Vickers Rich	Late Paleocene	Sao Jose de Itaborai	Brazil	Described in the Cuculidae, transferred to the Gracilitarsidae Mayr, 2001 by Mayr.	
Galbula hylochoreutes	Sp. nov.	Valid	D. Tab Rasmussen	Miocene	La Victoria Formation	Colombia	A Galbulidae.	
Heliadornis paratethydicus	Sp. nov.	Valid	Jirí Mlíkovský	Late Pliocene	MN 15-16	Slovakia	A Phaethontidae.	
Largirostrornis sexdentoris	Gen. nov et Sp. nov.	Valid	Hou Lianhai	Early Cretaceous	Valanginian, Jiufotang Formation	China	An Enantiornithes Walker, 1981, Cuspirostrisornithidae Hou, 1997, this is the type species of the new genus.	
Liaoningornis longidigitris	Gen. nov et Sp. nov.	Valid	Hou Lianhai	Early Cretaceous	Yixian Formation	China	An Enantiornithes Walker, 1981, Liaoningornithiformes L. H. Hou, 1997, Liaoningornithidae Hou, 1997, this is the type species of the new genus.	
Longchengornis sanyanensis	Gen. nov et Sp. nov.	Valid	Hou Lianhai	Early Cretaceous	Valanginian, Jiufotang Formation	China	An Enantiornithes Walker, 1981, Cuspirostrisornithidae Hou, 1997, this is the type species of the new genus.	
Pasquiaornis hardiei	Gen. nov. et Sp. nov.	Valid	Tim T. Tokaryk Stephen L. Cumbaa John E. Storer	Early Cretaceous	Cenomanian, Ashville Formation	Canada: Saskatchewan	An Hesperornithiformes Fürbringer, 1888, Baptornithidae American Ornithologists’ Union, 1910, this is the type of the new genus.	
Pasquiaornis tankei	Gen. nov. et Sp. nov.	Valid	Tim T. Tokaryk Stephen L. Cumbaa John E. Storer	Early Cretaceous	Cenomanian, Ashville Formation	Canada: Saskatchewan	An Hesperornithiformes Fürbringer, 1888, Baptornithidae American Ornithologists’ Union, 1910.	
Pleistorallus flemingi	Gen. nov. et Sp. nov.	Valid	Trevor H. Worthy	Pleistocene	Wanganui Subdivision	New Zealand	A Rallidae.	
Rhynchopsitta phillipsi	Sp. nov.	Valid	Amadeo M. Rea	Late Pleistocene	Cave Deposits	Mexico	A Psittacidae.	
Rupelrallus saxoniensis	Gen. nov et Sp. nov.	Valid	Karlheinz Fischer	Middle Oligocene	MP 23-24	Germany: Saxony	A Gruiformes, Parvigruidae G. Mayr, 2005.	
Songlingornis linghensis	Gen. nov et Sp. nov.	Valid	Hou Lianhai	Early Cretaceous	Valanginian, Jiufotang Formation	China	An Ornithuromorphae Chiappe, Ji, Ji et Norell, 1999, Songlingornithidae Hou, 1997, this is the type species of the new genus.	
Vanellus madagascariensis	Sp. nov.	Valid	Steven M. Goodman	Holocene	Madagascar	Madagascar	A Charadriidae.	
Urmiornis brodkorbi	Sp. nov.	Valid	Aleksandr A. Karkhu	Early Miocene	Lower Tarkhanian-Burdigalian?	Kazakhstan	An Eogruidae Wetmore, 1934, perhaps should be transferred to the genus Amphipelargus Lydekker, 1891.	

== Synapsids ==
=== Eutherians ===
Name	Status	Authors	Discovery year	Age	Unit	Location	Notes	Images
Granastrapotherium snorki	Valid	Johnson; Madden	1997	Middle Miocene	La Victoria Formation; Villavieja Formation	Colombia; Peru	An astrapotherian	Granastrapotherium
Xenastrapotherium aequatorialis	Valid	Johnson; Madden	1997	Early Miocene	Biblián Formation	Ecuador	An astrapotherian, a species of Xenastrapotherium	Granastrapotherium
Xenastrapotherium chaparralensis	Valid	Johnson; Madden	1997	Late Oligocene - Early Miocene	Tuné Formation	Colombia	An astrapotherian, a species of Xenastrapotherium	Granastrapotherium

== Humans ==
- Genetecist Michael Hammer reported findings that demonstrate that after the initial "out of Africa" radiation of modern humans at about 100,000 years ago, some humans eventually returned to Africa between 50,000 and 10,000 years ago.

== Exopaleontology ==
- Richard B. Hoover of NASA's Marshall Space Flight Center photographs what he believes to be microfossils in the martian Murchison meteorite.
