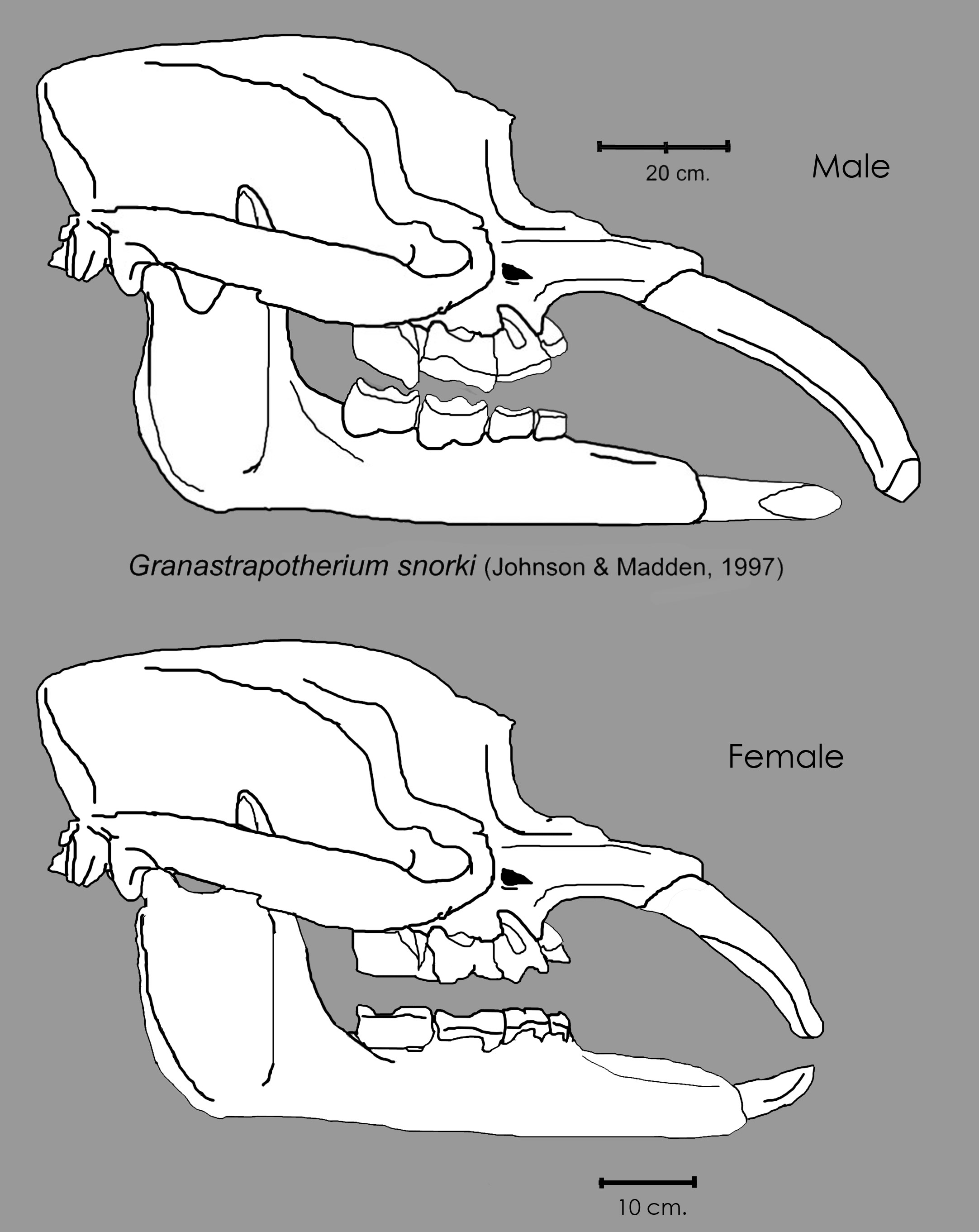
- Reconstructed skull of G. snorki

Scientific classification
- Kingdom: Animalia
- Phylum: Chordata
- Class: Mammalia
- Order: †Astrapotheria
- Family: †Astrapotheriidae
- Subfamily: †Uruguaytheriinae
- Genus: †Granastrapotherium; Johnson & Madden, 1997
- Species: †G. snorki

Binomial name
- †Granastrapotherium snorki Johnson & Madden, 1997

= Granastrapotherium =

Granastrapotherium Temporal range: Middle Miocene (Laventan) ~13.8–11.8 Ma

Extinct genus of mammals

Granastrapotherium is an extinct genus of ungulate mammals, described from remains found in rocks of the Honda Group in the Tatacoa Desert, in the Colombian departments of Huila and Tolima, at the Miocene fossil site La Venta. The only species formally recognized is Granastrapotherium snorki (from Spanish, gran, "great"; Astrapotherium, "lightning beast"; and snorkel, breathing tube, in reference to the trunk). Remains found in Bolivia and Peru, seem to belong to Granastrapotherium or a very similar animal.

== Description ==
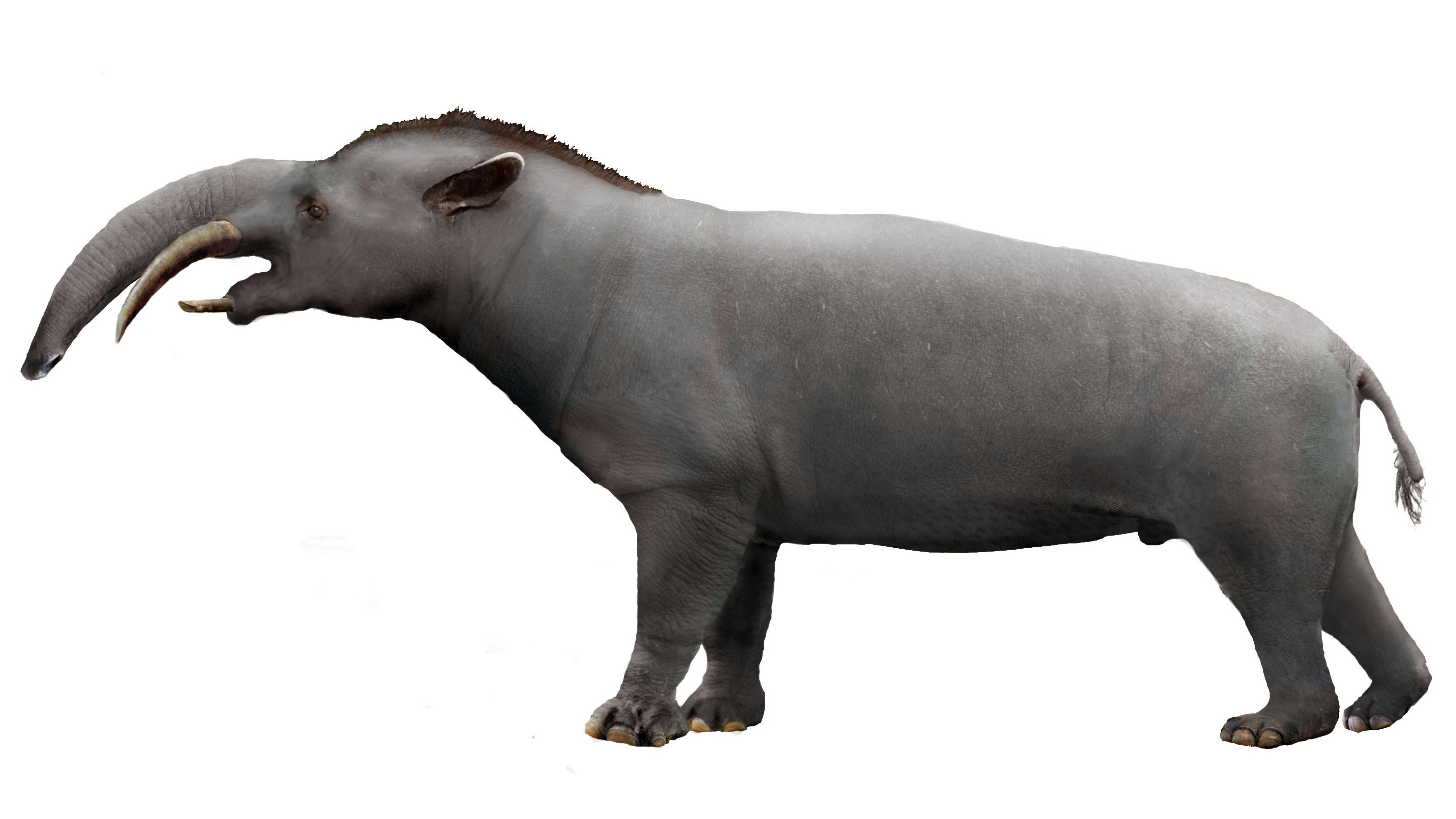
Life reconstruction of a male Granastrapotherium snorki.

This astrapothere differs from its coeval, the uruguaytheriine astrapotheriid Xenastrapotherium by their larger size, between 3 and 4 tonnes, with tusks about one meter long, making it one of the largest representatives of Astrapotheria, only surpassed by some species of Parastrapotherium. Other differences include the presence of only one premolar, the lack of incisors in both jaws and the disposition of the canine tooth, which are very large and horizontal, which reminds much less of those of hippos and more of the tusks of some ancient relatives of elephants (such as Palaeomastodon), although the tusks in elephants and their relatives are not formed by the canines but the incisors. Similarly, the large nostrils appear extremely withdrawn on the skull, so this creature had to have a larger trunk than other astrapotheres. Most likely, like elephants, this animal used its muscular proboscis together with its tusks to cut leaves off trees and shrubs.

== Phylogeny ==
Cladogram based in the phylogenetic analysis published by Vallejo-Pareja et al., 2015, showing the position of Granastrapotherium:

- Eoastrapostylops
- - Trigonostylops
  - - Tetragonostylops
    - - Albertogaudrya
      - - Scaglia
        - - Astraponotus
          - - Maddenia
            - - Comahuetherium
              - - Parastrapotherium
                - - Astrapotheriinae
                    - Astrapotherium
                    - Astrapothericulus
                  - Uruguaytheriinae
                    - Uruguaytherium
                    - - - Hilarcotherium
                        - Xenastrapotherium
                      - Granastrapotherium
