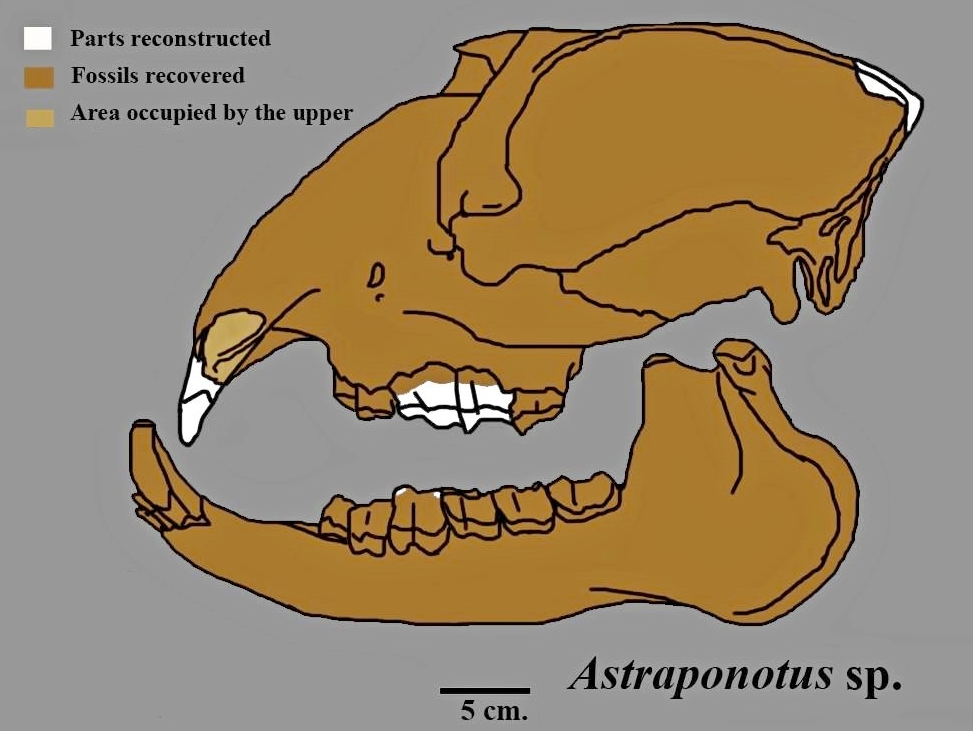
- Reconstruction of the skull of Astraponotus, based on Kramarz et al., 2010.

Scientific classification
- Kingdom: Animalia
- Phylum: Chordata
- Class: Mammalia
- Order: †Astrapotheria
- Family: †Astrapotheriidae
- Genus: †Astraponotus; Ameghino, 1901

Type species
- Astraponotus assymmetrum Ameghino, 1901

Species
- A. dicksoni Roth, 1903; A. dilatatus Roth, 1903; A. holdichi Roth, 1903; A. thompsoni Roth, 1903

Synonyms
- Megalophodon Roth 1903; Notamynus Roth 1903

= Astraponotus =

Astraponotus Temporal range: Middle-Late Eocene (Mustersan-Tinguirirican) ~48–33.9 Ma

Extinct genus of mammals

Astraponotus is an extinct genus of astrapotheriids. It lived during the Middle-Late Eocene (in the Mustersan and Tinguirirican of the South American land mammal ages (SALMA), 48-33.9 million years ago) and its fossil remains have been found in the Sarmiento Formation of Argentina, South America.

== Description ==
Unlike most astrapotheres, Astraponotus was equipped with an unusually high, short, narrow skull. The nasal bones were quite withdrawn, which suggests the presence of a short proboscis. Other unusual features of Astraponotus includes the extreme reduction of the premaxillary and nasal bones, the absence of an antorbital circle, and the reduction of the frontal region. The canines were long and strong, as in all astrapotheres.

== Classification ==
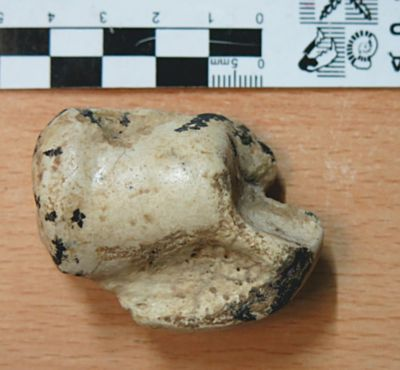
Right astragalus of Astraponotus at the Museo de La Plata.

Astraponotus was first described in 1901 by Florentino Ameghino, based on teeth fossils. The type species, Astraponotus assymetrum, comes from Eocene terrains known as Gran Barranca, in Patagonia (Argentina). The area was later nicknamed capas Astraponotenses ("Astraponotus' layers" in Spanish) due to the abundance of the peculiar fossils of this animal. Other species were described later (for example, A. dicksoni and A. holdichi), but always based just on the remains of the teeth and jaws. A nearly complete skull was not described until 2010, which has allowed hypothesis of the phylogenetic relationships of this animal more precisely.

The features observed in the teeth of Astraponotus are intermediate between the Middle Eocene astrapotheres and those of the Oligocene-Miocene in the degree of hypsodonty, the reduced dental formula, and the development of accessory occlusal elements. Moreover, the skull retains plesiomorphic features also observed in the archaic genus Trigonostylops, while the auditory region and the skull base are much closer to those of Parastrapotherium, Astrapotherium, and Granastrapotherium. Furthermore, the Astraponotus skull differs from all astrapotheres known in its disproportionate height, the narrowness of the skull, and other numerous cranial specializations that are opposite to Astrapotherium. These features seem surprisingly derived for an Eocene astrapothere, and suggest that these extreme cranial specializations were developed independently during the evolution of this order; Astraponotus could represent a lineage distinct from Astrapotherium and other Miocene forms.

== Phylogeny ==
Cladogram based in the phylogenetic analysis by Vallejo-Pareja et al., 2015, showing the position of Astraponotus:

- Eoastrapostylops
- - Trigonostylops
  - - Tetragonostylops
    - - Albertogaudrya
      - - Scaglia
        - - Astraponotus
          - - Maddenia
            - - Comahuetherium
              - - Parastrapotherium
                - - Astrapotheriinae
                    - Astrapotherium
                    - Astrapothericulus
                  - Uruguaytheriinae
                    - Uruguaytherium
                    - - - Hilarcotherium
                        - Xenastrapotherium
                      - Granastrapotherium
