= Astrapotherium =

Astrapotherium Temporal range: Early Miocene–Middle Miocene

Scientific classification
- Kingdom: Animalia
- Phylum: Chordata
- Class: Mammalia
- Order: †Astrapotheria
- Family: †Astrapotheriidae
- Subfamily: †Astrapotheriinae
- Genus: †Astrapotherium; Burmeister, 1879

Type species
- †Nesodon magnus Owen, 1853

Species
- †A. burmeisteri Mercerat, 1891; †A. guillei Kramarz et al. 2019; †A. magnum (Owen, 1853); †A. ruderarium Ameghino, 1902

Synonyms
- Genus synonymy: Listriotherium Mercerat 1891; Mesembriotherium Moreno 1882; Xylotherium Mercerat 1891; Synonyms of A. burmeisteri: Astrapotherium giganteum Ameghino, 1891; Astrapotherium delimitatum Ameghino, 1891; Synonyms of A. magnum: Astrapotherium columnatum Ameghino, 1891; Astrapotherium nanum Ameghino, 1891; Astrapotherium karaikense Ameghino, 1904b; Astrapodon carinatus Ameghino, 1891; Synonyms of A. ruderarium: Parastrapotherium paucum Ameghino 1902; Parastrapotherium crassum (partim) Ameghino 1902; Astrapothericulus minusculus Ameghino 1902; Astrapothericulus laevisculus Ameghino 1902; Astrapotherium triangulidens Ameghino 1902; Prochalicotherium patagonicum Ameghino 1902

Extinct genus of mammals

Astrapotherium ("lightning beast") is an extinct genus of large astrapotherian ungulate native to South America during the early-middle Miocene. It is the best known member of the group. The type species. A. magnum have been found in the Santa Cruz Formation in Argentina. Other fossils have been found in the Deseado, Sarmiento, and Aisol Formations of Argentina and Chile (Cura-Mallín Group).

== Description ==
Restoration and size comparison of A. magnum

Astrapotherium had an elongated body, with a total length around 2.5 m (8.2 ft), a weight of nearly 1,000 kg (2,200 lb), and relatively short limbs. Larger estimates suggest its body mass was up to 1,600–3,500 kilograms (3,500–7,700 lb). It had small plantigrade feet, and the hind limbs were significantly weaker than the fore limbs. Its four canine teeth were elongated to form short tusks, and it had broad, protruding lower incisors, which likely ground against a horny pad in the upper jaw, as in many modern ruminants.

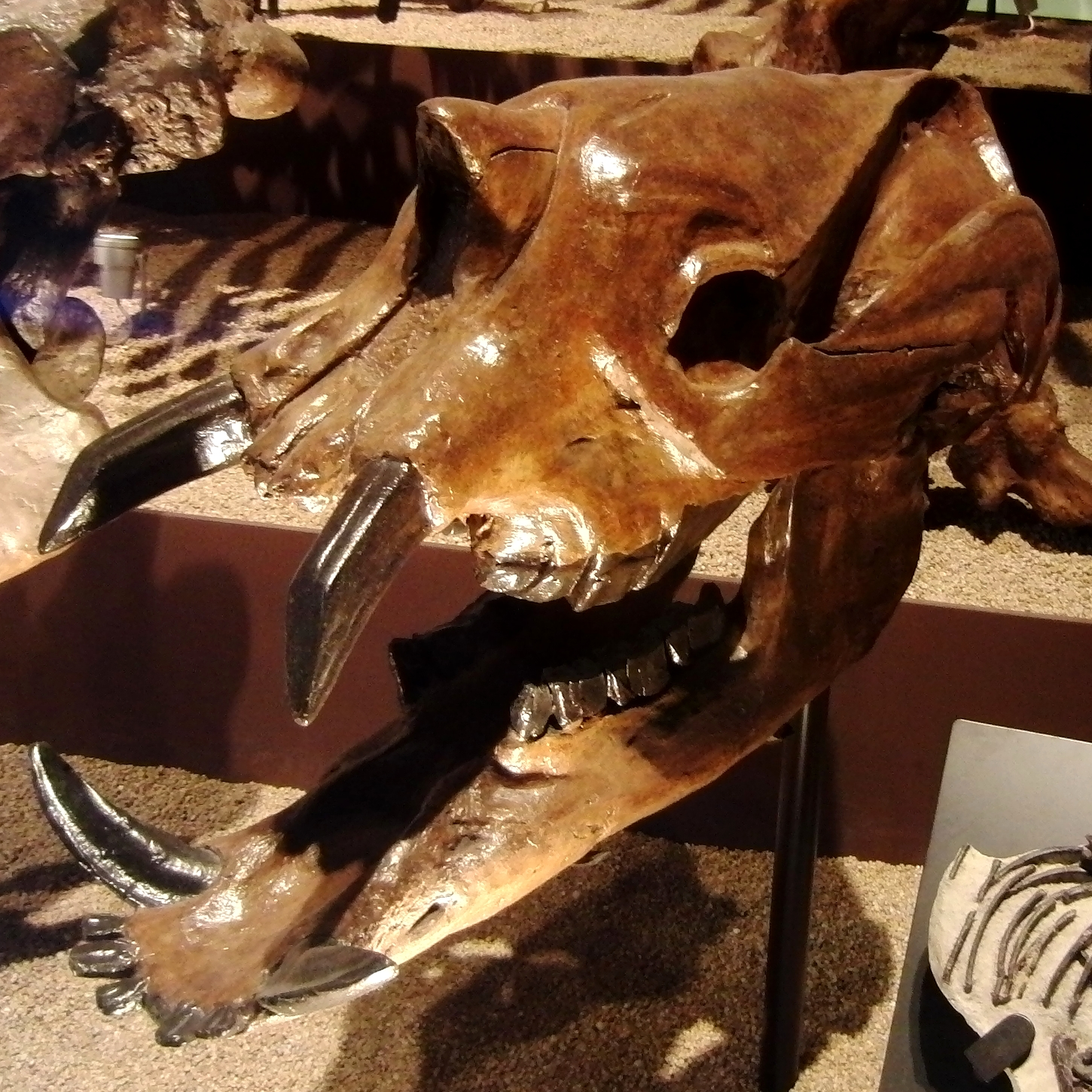
Skull of Astrapotherium magnum

Astrapotherium has been inferred to have had a tapir-like proboscis, based on its retracted narials and short upper jaw.

== Classification ==
Cladogram based in the phylogenetic analysis published by Vallejo-Pareja et al., 2015, showing the position of Astrapotherium:

- Eoastrapostylops
- - Trigonostylops
  - - Tetragonostylops
    - - Albertogaudrya
      - - Scaglia
        - - Astraponotus
          - - Maddenia
            - - Comahuetherium
              - - Parastrapotherium
                - - Astrapotheriinae
                    - Astrapotherium
                    - Astrapothericulus
                  - Uruguaytheriinae
                    - Uruguaytherium
                    - - - Hilarcotherium
                        - Xenastrapotherium
                      - Granastrapotherium

== Paleobiology ==
The animal was probably at least partially aquatic, living in shallow water in a similar manner to a modern hippopotamus.
