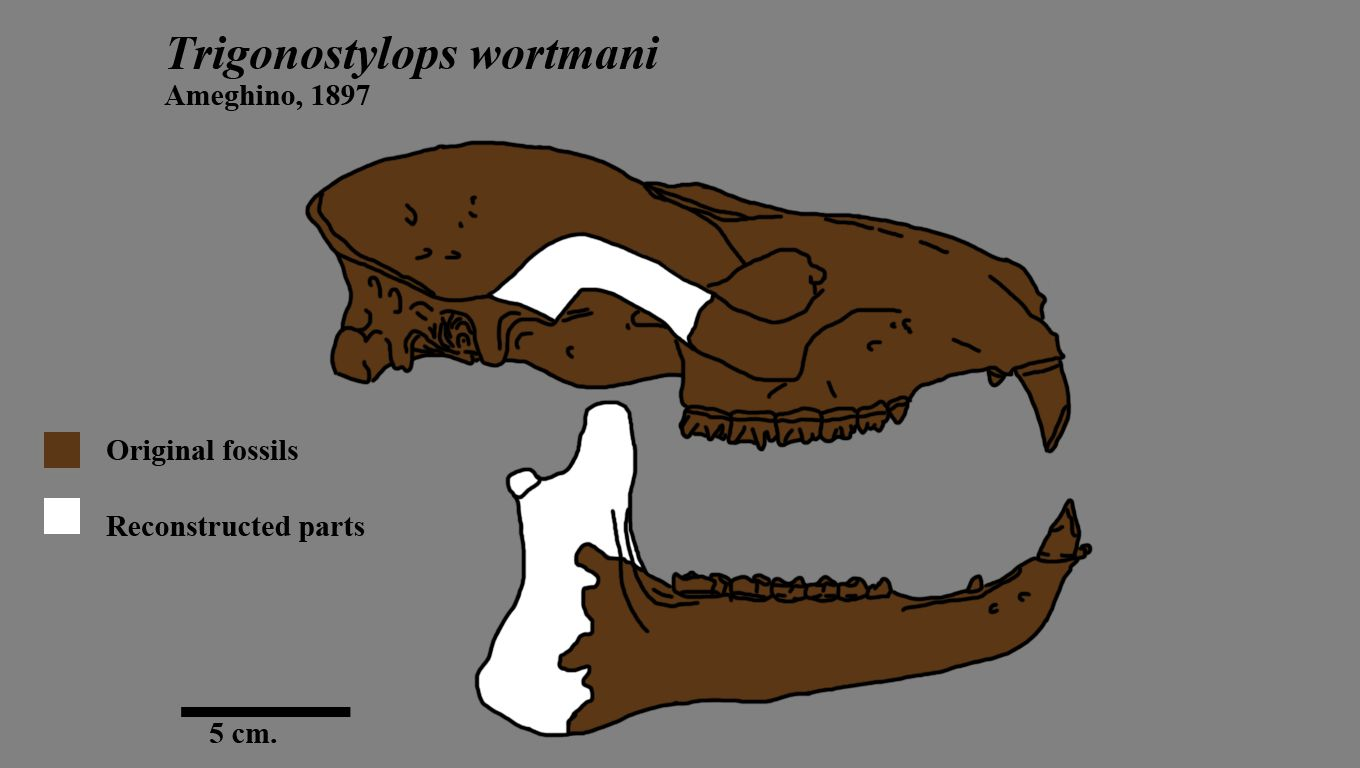
- Skull restoration of Trigonostylops

Scientific classification
- Kingdom: Animalia
- Phylum: Chordata
- Class: Mammalia
- Order: †Astrapotheria
- Family: †Trigonostylopidae
- Genus: †Trigonostylops; Ameghino 1897

Type species
- Trigonostylops wortmani Ameghino 1897

Species
- T. gegenbauri Roth 1899; T. wortmani Ameghino 1897

= Trigonostylops =

Trigonostylops Temporal range: Late Paleocene-Late Eocene (Riochican-Tinguirirican) ~58.7–33.9 Ma

Genus of mammals (fossil)

Trigonostylops is an extinct genus of South American meridiungulatan ungulate, from the Late Paleocene to Late Eocene (Itaboraian to Tinguirirican in the SALMA classification) of South America (Argentina and Peru) and Antarctica (Seymour Island). It is the only member of the family Trigonostylopidae.

== Description ==
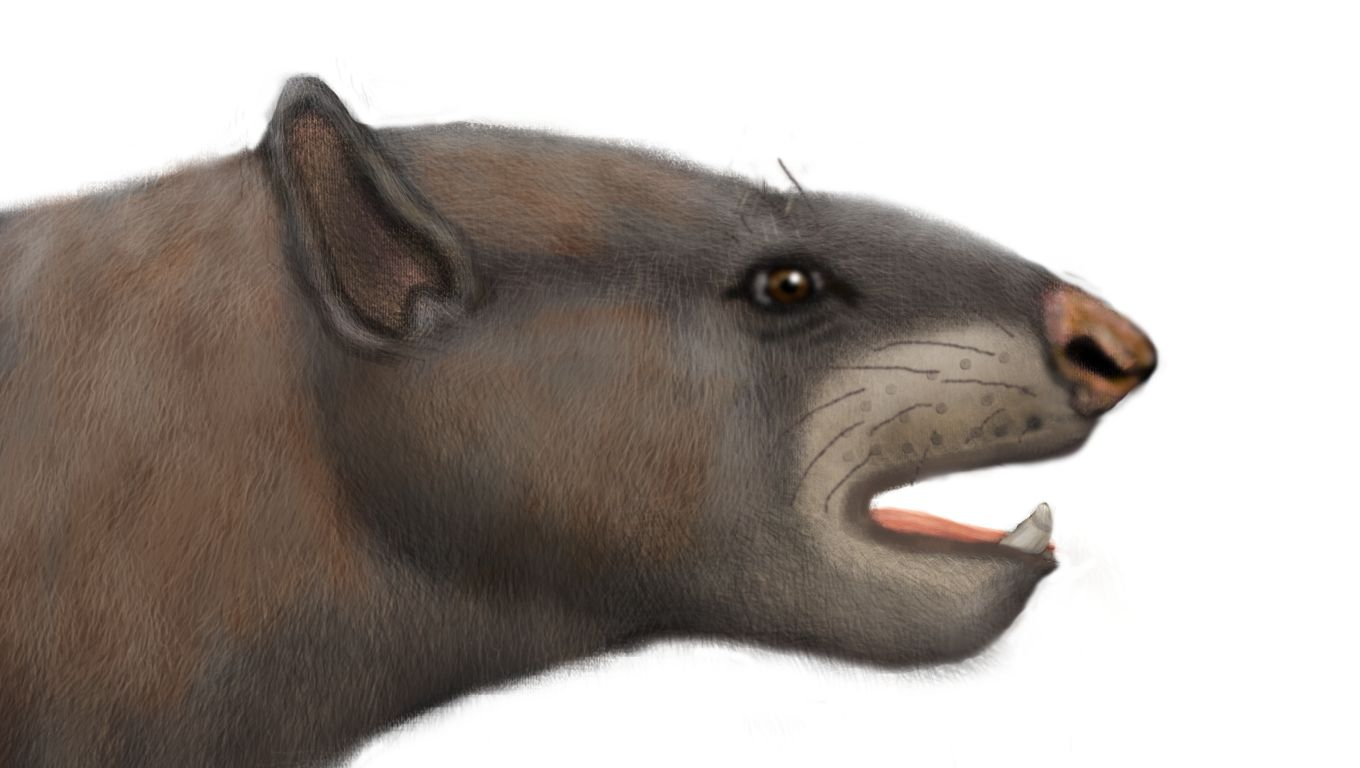
Interpretation of T. wortmani

A complete skull of the type species, T. wortmani, has been found, and it has been classified as an astrapothere based on its large lower incisors.

== Phylogeny ==
Cladogram based in the phylogenetic analysis published by Vallejo Pareja et al., 2015, showing the position of Trigonostylops:

- Eoastrapostylops
- - Trigonostylops
  - - Tetragonostylops
    - - Albertogaudrya
      - - Scaglia
        - - Astraponotus
          - - Maddenia
            - - Comahuetherium
              - - Parastrapotherium
                - - Astrapotheriinae
                    - Astrapotherium
                    - Astrapothericulus
                  - Uruguaytheriinae
                    - Uruguaytherium
                    - - - Hilarcotherium
                        - Xenastrapotherium
                      - Granastrapotherium

== Distribution ==
Locations of Trigonostylops fossils
Pozo Formation
Sarmiento Formation
Las Flores Formation
Not show: La Meseta Formation in Seymour Island, Antarctica

Fossils of Trigonostylops have been found in:

Paleocene

- Las Flores Formation, Argentina

Eocene

- La Meseta Formation, Antarctica
- Casamayor, Divisadero Largo, Koluel Kaike and Sarmiento Formations, Argentina
- Pozo Formation, Peru
