= 2009 in paleomammalogy =

This paleomammalogy list records new fossil mammal taxa that were described during the year 2009, as well as notes other significant paleomammalogy discoveries and events which occurred during that year.

== Mammals ==
- A study by J. R. Foster is published estimating the body masses of mammals from the Late Jurassic Morrison Formation by using the ratio of dentary length to body mass of modern marsupials as a reference. Foster concludes that Docodon was the most massive mammal genus of the formation at 141g and Fruitafossor was the least massive at 6g. The average Morrison mammal had a mass of 48.5g. A graph of the body mass distribution of Morrison mammal genera produced a right-skewed curve, meaning that there were more low-mass genera.
- Fujiwara, S. I. (2009). "Olecranon orientation as an indicator of elbow joint angle in the stance phase, and estimation of forelimb posture in extinct quadruped animals". Journal of Morphology. 270 (9): 1107–1121. doi:10.1002/jmor.10748. PMID 19378290. S2CID 23878624.
- Fujiwara, S. I.; Kuwazuru, O.; Inuzuka, N.; Yochikawa, N. (2009). "Relationship between scapular position and structural strength of rib cage in quadruped animals". Journal of Morphology. 270 (9): 1084–1094. doi:10.1002/jmor.10744. PMID 19378269. S2CID 5574036.
- Mitchell, G.; van Sittert, S.J.; Skinner, J.D. (2009). "Sexual selection is not the origin of long necks in giraffes". Journal of Zoology. 278 (4): 281–286. doi:10.1111/j.1469-7998.2009.00573.x.

Newly named mammals
Name	Status	Authors	Age	Unit	Location	Notes	Images
Anoiapithecus	Valid	Moyà-Solà; Alba; et al. (Note: Moyà-Solà, Alba, Almécija, Casanovas-Vilar, Köhler, De Esteban-Trivigno, Robles, Galindo, Fortuny.)	Middle Miocene		Spain		
Apatemys pygmaeus	Valid	Beard & Dawson	Early Wasatchian		United States	A member of the family Apatemyidae.	
Arcantiodelphys	Valid	Vullo; Gheerbrant; et al. (Note: Vullo, Gheerbrant, de Muizon, Néraudeau.)	Cenomanian		France		
Archaeonycteris praecursor	Valid	Estravís	Early Eocene	Silveirinha Formation	Portugal	An archaeonycterid bat	
Arvicanthis broekhuisi	Valid	Hordijk; De Bruijn	Latest Miocene or earliest Pliocene	Komnina Formation	Greece	A rodent belonging to the family Muridae, a species of Arvicanthis.	
Bonisicyon	Valid	Werdelin & Simpson	Late Miocene		Ethiopia; Kenya	A bear dog. The type species is Bonisicyon illacabo.	
Choctawius	Valid	Beard & Dawson	Early Wasatchian		United States	A member of Primatomorpha belonging to the family Microsyopidae. The type species is C. foxi; genus also includes "Navajovius" mckennai Szalay (1969).	
Colpocherus	Valid	Beard & Dawson	Early Wasatchian		United States	A member of the family Amphilemuridae. The type species is C. mississippiensis.	
Corbarimys? nomadus	Valid	Beard & Dawson	Early Wasatchian		United States	A rodent related to members of the genus Paramys.	
Corriebaatar	Valid	Rich; Vickers-Rich; et al. (Note: Rich, Vickers-Rich, Flannery, Kear, Cantrill, Komarower, Kool, Pickering, Trusler, Morton, van Klaveren, Fitzgerald.)	Aptian	Wonthaggi Formation	Australia	First Australian multituberculate.	
Darwinius	Valid	Franzen; Gingerich; et al. (Note: Franzen, Gingerich, Habersetzer, Hurum, von Koenigswald, Smith.)	early Geiseltalian	Messel Formation	Germany		Darwinius
Diaceratherium massiliae	Disputed	Ménouret & Guérin	Late Oligocene		France	A rhinoceros. Originally described as a species of Diaceratherium; Tissier, Antoine & Becker (2021) interpreted it as a junior synonym of Ronzotherium romani.	
Diacocherus dockeryi	Valid	Beard & Dawson	Early Wasatchian		United States	A member of Erinaceomorpha belonging to the group Litocherinae.	
Disallomys	Valid	Korth	Late Oligocene		United States	An aplodontiid rodent, a new genus for the species "Allomys" storeri Tedrow and Korth. Genus also contains two new species: Disallomys robustus and D. intermedius.	
Douglassciurus sapphirus	Valid	Korth	Late Oligocene		United States	A sciurine squirrel, a species of Douglassciurus.	
Duerotherium	Valid	Cuesta; Badiola	Middle Eocene			An anoplotheriine artiodactyl	
Ectocion nanabeensis	Valid	Beard & Dawson	Early Wasatchian		United States		
Eogale	Valid	Beard & Dawson	Early Wasatchian		United States	A member of the family Miacidae. The type species is E. parydros.	
Eritherium	Valid	Gheerbrant	Early Thanetian	Ouled Abdoun basin	Morocco	The oldest, smallest and most primitive elephant relative.	
Franimys? actites	Valid	Beard & Dawson	Early Wasatchian		United States	A rodent related to members of the genus Paramys.	
Ganlea	Valid	Beard; Marivaux; et al. (Note: Beard, Marivaux, Chaimanee, Jaeger, Marandat, Tafforeau, Soe, Tun, Kyaw.)	late Middle Eocene	Pondaung Formation	Myanmar		
Haplomylus meridionalis	Valid	Beard & Dawson	Early Wasatchian		United States	A member of the family Hyopsodontidae.	
Heliscomys walshi	Valid	Kelly	Middle Eocene	Sespe Formation	United States	A heliscomyid rodent, a species of Heliscomys.	
Howellictis	Valid	De Bonis et al.	Late Miocene		Chad	A member of Mustelidae belonging to the subfamily Mellivorinae. The type species is H. valentini.	
Kahawamys	Valid	Stevens; Holroyd; et al. (Note: Stevens, Holroyd, Roberts, O'connor, Gottfried.)	Late Oligocene	Nsungwe Formation	Tanzania	A thryonomyoid rodent	
Legionarictis	Valid	Tseng; Wang; Stewart	Miocene (Barstovian)	Temblor Formation	United States	A mustelid. The type species is Legionarictis fortidens.	
Maiacetus	Valid	Gingerich; ul-Haq; et al. (Note: Gingerich, ul-Haq, von Koenigswald, Sanders, Smith, Zalmout.)	early Middle Eocene	Habib Rahi Formation	Pakistan		Maiacetus
Maddenia	Valid	Kramarz; Bond	Late Oligocene	Sarmiento Formation	Argentina	An astrapothere astrapotherid.	
Meiconodon	Valid	Kusuhashi; Hu; et al. (Note: Kusuhashi, Hu, Wang, Hirasawa, Matsuoka.)	Aptian/Albian	Fuxin Formation; Shahai Formation	China	A alticonodontine triconodontid	
Miacis igniculus	Valid	Beard & Dawson	Early Wasatchian		United States		
Microtodon komanensis	Valid	Hordijk; De Bruijn	Early Pliocene	Ptolemais Formation	Greece	A rodent.	
Mimoperadectes houdei	Valid	Horovitz et al.	Early Wasatchian	Willwood Formation	United States		
Mimoperadectes sowasheensis	Valid	Beard & Dawson	Early Wasatchian		United States		
Miosengi	Valid	Grossman; Holroyd	Early Miocene	Lothidok Formation	Kenya	An elephant shrew. The type species is M. butleri.	
Mustela nivalis kudarensis	Valid	Baryshnikov	Middle to late Pleistocene		South Ossetia	A fossil subspecies of the least weasel.	
Myomimus igdeliensis	Valid	Suata-Alpaslan	Early Pliocene (Ruscinian)		Turkey	A dormouse, a species of Myomimus.	
Mytonolagus ashcrafti	Valid	Fostowicz-Frelik & Tabrum	Eocene		United States	A member of the family Leporidae.	
Nalameryx	Valid	Métais; Welcomme; Ducrocq	Middle Oligocene	Chitarwata Formation	Pakistan	A lophiomerycid ruminant	
Naranius americanus	Valid	Beard & Dawson	Early Wasatchian		United States	A member of the family Cimolestidae.	
Niglarodon brachyodon	Valid	Korth	Late Oligocene		United States	An aplodontiid rodent, a species of Niglarodon.	
Notiolofos	Valid	Bond et al.	Eocene	La Meseta Formation	Antarctica (Seymour Island)	A member of Litopterna belonging to the family Sparnotheriodontidae; a replacement name for Notolophus Bond et al. (2006).	
Occitanomys (Rhodomys) vandami	Valid	Suata-Alpaslan	Early Pliocene (Ruscinian)		Turkey	A member of the family Muridae.	
Ochotona mediterranensis	Valid	Suata-Alpaslan	Early Pliocene (Ruscinian)		Turkey	A pika.	
Oligospermophilus emryi	Valid	Korth	Late Oligocene		United States	A cedromurine squirrel, a species of Oligospermophilus emryi.	
Palaeosinopa aestuarium	Valid	Beard & Dawson	Early Wasatchian		United States		
Paramys dispar	Valid	Beard & Dawson	Early Wasatchian		United States		
Praesinomegaceros venustus	Valid	Vislobokova	Late Miocene (late Turolian)		Russia	A megacerine deer, a species of Praesinomegaceros.	
Proconsul meswae	Valid	Harrison; Andrews	Early Miocene		Kenya	A species of Proconsul or Ugandapithecus.	
Prosciurus clausulus	Valid	Korth	Late Oligocene		United States	An aplodontiid rodent, a species of Prosciurus.	
Proterix minimus	Valid	Korth	Late Oligocene		United States	An erinaceid, a species of Proterix.	
Pseudomeriones hansi	Valid	Suata-Alpaslan	Early Pliocene (Ruscinian)		Turkey	A gerbil.	
Puijila	Valid	Rybczynski; Dawson; Tedford	Early Miocene		Canada	Extinct genus of pinniped.	Puijila
Sallamys quispea	Valid	Shockey et al.	Deseadan	Moquegua Formation; Salla Beds	Bolivia; Peru	A caviomorph rodent related to the group Octodontoidea. Originally described as a species of Sallamys; subsequently transferred to the genus Migraveramus by Pérez et al. (in press).	
Simplomys	Valid	García-Paredes in García-Paredes, Peláez-Campomanes & Álvarez-Sierra	Miocene		France; Germany; Portugal; Spain; Switzerland	A dormouse. The type species is "Pseudodryomys" simplicidens De Bruijn (1966); genus also includes "Pseudodryomys" robustus De Bruijn (1967), "Pseudodryomys" aljaphi Hugueney et al. (1978) and "Pseudodryomys" julii Daams (1989), as well as new species S. meulenorum.	
Viverriscus	Valid	Beard & Dawson	Early Wasatchian		United States	A member of the family Viverravidae. The type species is V. omnivorus.	
Wyonycteris primitivus	Valid	Beard & Dawson	Early Wasatchian		United States	A member of Soricomorpha belonging to the family Nyctitheriidae.	
