= Liarthrus =

Liarthrus Temporal range: Late Oligocene (Deseadan ~29–21 Ma

Scientific classification
- Kingdom: Animalia
- Phylum: Chordata
- Class: Mammalia
- Order: †Astrapotheria
- Family: †Astrapotheriidae
- Genus: †Liarthrus; Ameghino, 1895

Type species
- Liarthrus copei Ameghino, 1895

Extinct genus of mammals

Liarthrus ("smooth joint") is a genus of astrapotheriid mammal known from the Late Oligocene (Deseadan SALMA, around 29–21 mya) Sarmiento Formation of Santa Cruz Province, Argentina. It was described by the Argentine paleontologist Florentino Ameghino in 1895 along with several other genera from the "Pyrotherium Beds", which were then believed to date to the Cretaceous period. Ameghino described Liarthus on the basis of fragmentary specimen, consisting of only a right astragalus (tarsal bone), premolar 4, and an incomplete premolar from the upper jaws. Only one species was described, L. copei, the species name honoring the American paleontologist Edward Drinker Cope, who lived at the same time as Ameghino. Liarthrus was synonymized with the other astrapothere Parastrapotherium in 1914 by American mammalogist Frederic Loomis, though it was revalidated by a 2008 analysis of Parastrapotherium. Liarthrus was a herbivorous mammal, being an astrapothere, which had large tusks on their skulls and mandibles in addition to a large body size.
