= Patterning cascade =

Evolutionary developmental biology model

The patterning cascade is a model in evolutionary developmental biology for the evolution of tooth cusps in mammalian teeth.

== Predictions ==
The patterning cascade was derived from Phoca teeth and predicts that the main cusp of a molar tooth will determine the size of the accessory cusps mesial and distal to it, and that the size of these cusps in turn determine how tall later forming cusps mesial and distal to them are. This means that if cusp A is the main cusp and a five-cusped tooth possesses, in order from mesialmost to distalmost, cusps B_{2}, B, A, C, and D, then the size of each cusp is going to decrease linearly and proportionally. Morphospaces where cusp C is absent and D is present, for example, or where the height difference between cusp C and D is much greater than that between cusp A and cusp C, are prohibited according to the predictions of the patterning cascade model.

The patterning cascade model has been used to explain the molariform morphology of many artiodactyl premolars, suggesting that genetic factors knocking out or decreasing the modularity of the premolar and molar rows causes the strength of activation and inhibition developmental mechanisms governing the placement of enamel knots in developing premolar tooth buds to resemble that of molars.

== See also ==
- Inhibitory cascade
