= Maddenia =

Maddenia Temporal range: Late Oligocene (Deseadan) ~29–21 Ma

Scientific classification
- Domain: Eukaryota
- Kingdom: Animalia
- Phylum: Chordata
- Class: Mammalia
- Order: †Astrapotheria
- Family: †Astrapotheriidae
- Genus: †Maddenia; Kramarz & Bond, 2009
- Species: †M. lapidaria

Binomial name
- †Maddenia lapidaria Kramarz & Bond, 2009

Extinct genus of mammals

Maddenia is an extinct genus of astrapothere, meridiungulate herbivore mammals characterised by their large tusks and the development of a proboscis, endemic to South America. This genus was discovered in an outcrop near to the Lake Colhué Huapi in the place La Cantera, in the Chubut Province, in Argentina, in sediments corresponding to the Sarmiento Formation, dating to the Late Oligocene (Deseadan South American land mammal age).

== Etymology ==
The name of the genus Maddenia, honours the palaeontologist Richard Madden, for his contributions to the palaeontology of South America. The name of the type and only known species, Maddenia lapidaria, derives from the Latin lapidarius, "of stone".

== Description ==
This species is based in the holotype MPEF PV 7735, a fragment of jawbone with molar and premolar teeth associated and a partial canine associated, in addition to several additional specimens that include isolated teeth and other fragments of jaws. From these remains it was established that Maddenia was a small astrapothere, about 50% smaller than Astraponotus. Its molar were high, with complex crowns, and it had moderately developed canines, characteristic of the large advanced astrapotheres of the Oligocene and the Miocene, like Astrapotherium and Granastrapotherium.

This suggests that it must to occupy a habitat differentiated regarding other forms of big size, and that by its anatomical characteristics constitutes an intermediate form between the primitive forms like Albertogaudrya and the astrapotherids like Parastrapotherium, with which conform sister taxa to the two subfamilies of the family Astrapotheriidae, Astrapotheriinae and Uruguaytheriinae.

== Phylogeny ==
Cladogram according to Bond et al., 2011, showing the phylogenetic position of Maddenia:

- Astrapotheria
  - Eoastrapostylops
  - - Trigonostylops
    - - Tetragonostylops
      - - Antarctodon
        - - Albertogaudrya
          - - Scaglia
            - Astrapotheriidae
              - Astraponotus
              - - Maddenia
                - - Parastrapotherium
                  - - Astrapotherium
                    - Granastrapotherium
