= Scaglia kraglievichorum =

Scaglia kraglievichorum Temporal range: Mid-Late Eocene (Casamayoran-Divisaderan) ~48.6–37.2 Ma

Scientific classification
- Kingdom: Animalia
- Phylum: Chordata
- Class: Mammalia
- Order: †Astrapotheria
- Family: †Astrapotheriidae
- Subfamily: †Astrapotheriinae
- Genus: †Scaglia; Simpson, 1957
- Species: †S. kraglievichorum

Binomial name
- †Scaglia kraglievichorum Simpson, 1957

Extinct genus of mammals

Scaglia is an extinct genus of South American astrapotherid land mammal that lived during the Eocene (Casamayoran to Divisaderan in the SALMA classification). The genus is monotypic, with its only known species (and thus its type species) being Scaglia kraglievichorum.

== Etymology ==
The genus was named after Argentine naturalist Galileo Juan Scaglia (1915–1989), and the type species after Argentine palaeontologist Lucas Kraglievich (1886–1932).

== Description ==
Its type specimen, recovered from the Sarmiento Formation of Argentina, is MMCNT-MdP 207. Like Albertogaudrya, Scaglia was the size of a sheep or a small tapir, hence among the larger mammals in South America at that time.

== Phylogeny ==
Cladogram according to Bond et al., 2011, standing out the phylogenetic position of Scaglia:

- Astrapotheria
  - Eoastrapostylops
  - - Trigonostylops
    - - Tetragonostylops
      - - Antarctodon
        - - Albertogaudrya
          - - Scaglia
            - Astrapotheriidae
              - Astraponotus
              - - Maddenia
                - - Parastrapotherium
                  - - Astrapotherium
                    - Granastrapotherium
