= Shecenia =

Shecenia Temporal range: Late Paleocene-Early Eocene ~57–54 Ma

Scientific classification
- Kingdom: Animalia
- Phylum: Chordata
- Class: Mammalia
- Order: †Astrapotheria
- Genus: †Shecenia; Simpson 1935

Type species
- Shecenia ctirneru Simpson, 1935

Species
- S. ctirneru Simpson 1935

Extinct genus of mammal

Shecenia is an extinct genus of mammal, probably belonging to the order Astrapotheria. It lived between the Late Paleocene and the Early Eocene, and its fossilized remains were found in South America.

== Description ==
This animal is known from very fragmentary remains, including a partial mandible. Its relatives, the astrapotheres, vaguely resembled tapirs.

The mandibular symphysis was quite long and flat on the interior surface. it had two pairs of small incisors, framed posteriorly and a bit laterally by a pair of very strong, long-rooted, very curved and forward-protruding teeth. Behind them was a large diastema, followed by another pair of very strong teeth, slightly curved forward but with a short root. These two teeth were approximately located near the middle of the symphysis. Like Trigonostylops, the symphysis of Shecenia had a flat lower edge.

== Classification ==
Shecenia was first described in 1935 by George Gaylord Simpson, based on fossils found in probably Lower Eocene terrains from Argentina. The type species is Shecenia ctirneru, but other remains from the Late Paleocene have also been attributed to the genus.

Shecenia is considered an archaic astrapothere, a mysterious group of South American mammals, vaguely reminding of tapirs. Shecenia is considered to be a member of Trigonostylopidae, a clade comprising some of the oldest and more archaic members of Astrapotheria.

== Bibliography ==
- G. G. Simpson. 1935. Descriptions of the oldest known South American mammals, from the Rio Chico Formation. American Museum Novitates 793:1-25
- G. G. Simpson. 1967. The beginning of the age of mammals in South America. Part II. Bulletin of the American Museum of Natural History 137:1-260
- M. O. Woodburne, F. J. Goin, M. S. Raigemborn, M. Heizler, J. N. Gelfo and E. V. Oliveira. 2014. Revised timing of the South American early Paleogene land mammal ages. Journal of South American Earth Sciences 54:109-119
