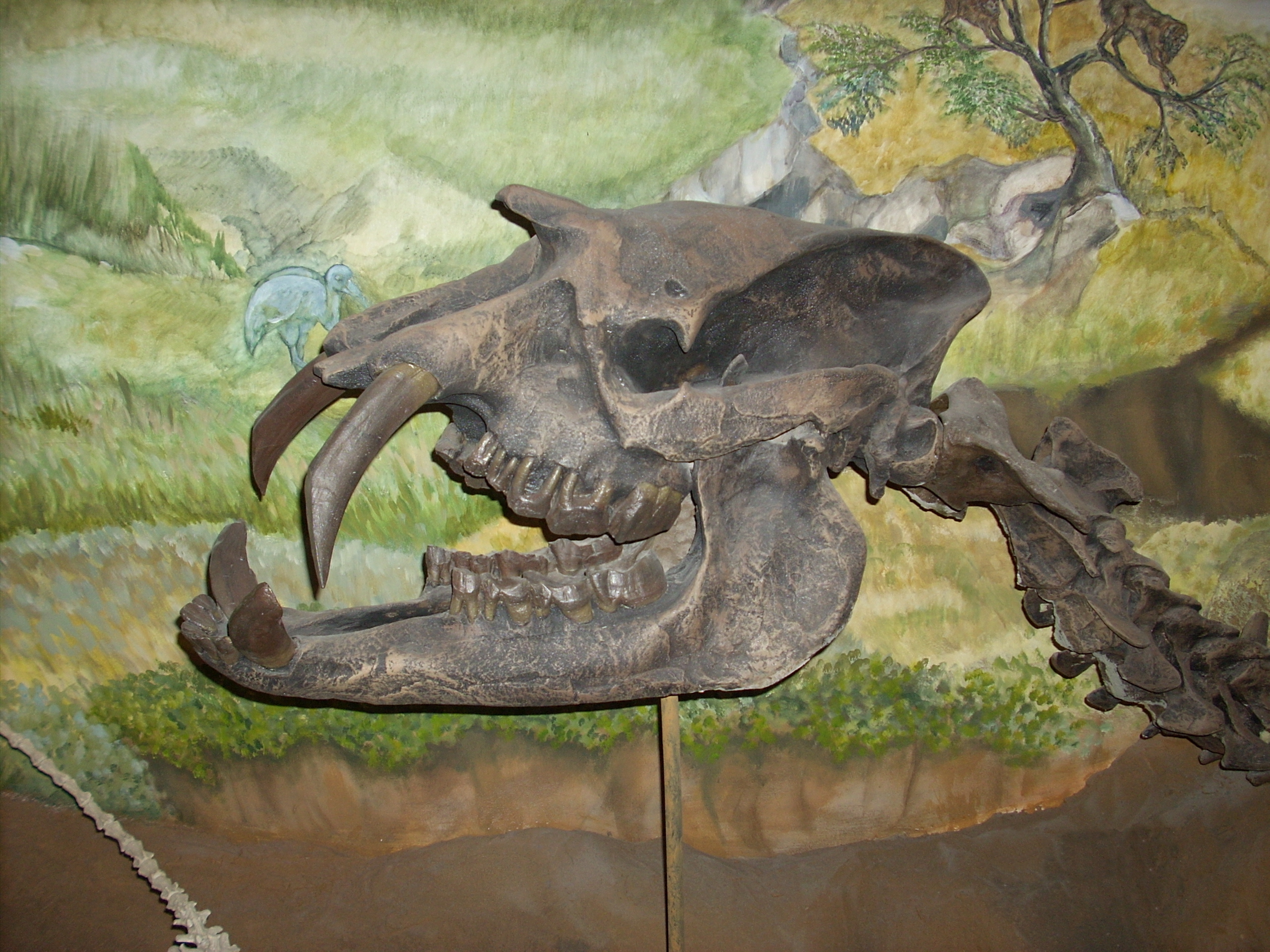
- Skull of Astrapotherium
- Reconstruction of Astrapotherium

Scientific classification
- Kingdom: Animalia
- Phylum: Chordata
- Class: Mammalia
- Infraclass: Placentalia
- Clade: †Meridiungulata
- Order: †Astrapotheria; Lydekker 1894

Families
- † Astrapotheriidae † Eoastrapostylopidae † Trigonostylopidae

= Astrapotheria =

Astrapotheria Temporal range: Late Paleocene-Middle Miocene ~59–11.8 Ma

Extinct order of mammals

Astrapotheria is an extinct order of South American and Antarctic hoofed mammals that existed from the late Paleocene to the Middle Miocene, 59 to 11.8 million years ago. Astrapotheres were large, rhinoceros-like animals and have been called one of the most bizarre orders of mammals with an enigmatic evolutionary history.

The taxonomy of this order is not clear, but it may belong to Meridiungulata (along with Notoungulata, Litopterna, Pyrotheria and Xenungulata). In turn, Meridiungulata is believed to belong to the extant superorder Laurasiatheria. Some scientists have regarded the astrapotheres (and sometimes the Meridiungulata as a whole) as members of the clade Atlantogenata. However, collagen and mitochondrial DNA sequence data analysed in 2015 places at least the notoungulates and litopterns firmly within Laurasiatheria, as a sister group to the perissodactyls.

== Description ==
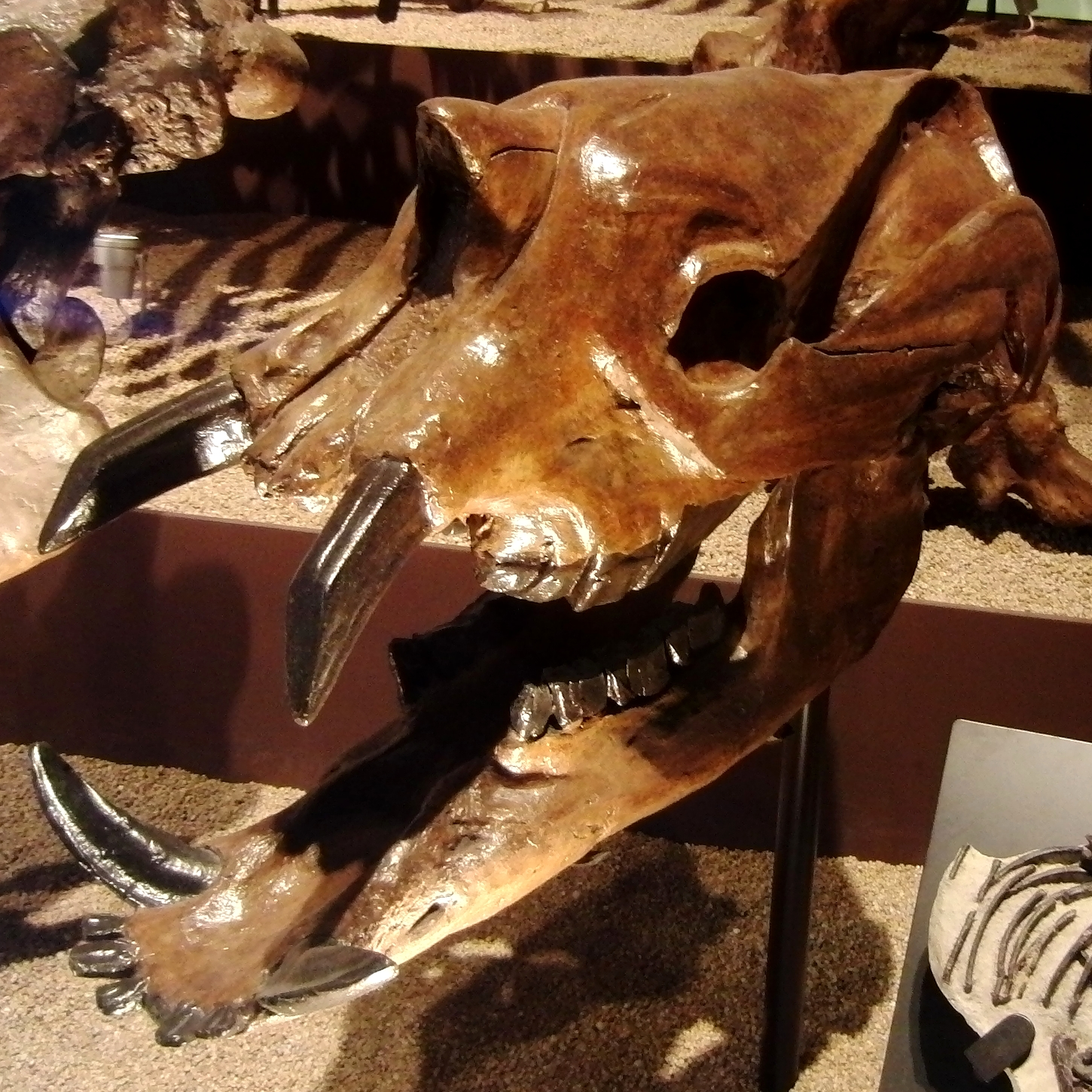
Astrapotherium magnum skull

Their lophodont molars and tusk-like canines became extremely large and ever-growing in later astrapotheres. The upper molars lack an ectocingulum and are dominated by well-developed ectoloph and protoloph. Additional lophs formed in some derived taxa. They had lower molars with two cross-lophs, including a high protocristid, and eventually became almost selenodont. As a result, their dentition is similar to notoungulates, but it seems to have evolved independently. The cheek teeth are similar to rhinocerotoids, including similar microstructure, which indicate they had the same function. Members of Astrapotheria possess mandibular molar area ratio proportions that violate the predictions of the inhibitory cascade evolutionary developmental biological model of molar tooth row development, with the M_{3} being substantially smaller than expected.

Postcranially, astrapotheres are relatively robust and more or less graviportal but have slender long bones, most notably in the hindlegs, suggesting they were amphibious. In order to support their proboscises and large heads they had relatively long and massive necks in relation to the rest of the vertebral column. Their feet are pentadactyl with short and stout podial and metapodial bones. Most characteristic for the order are the flat astragalus, equipped with a short neck and a flat head, articulating with both the navicular and cuboid bones; and their calcaneus with its enlarged peroneal tubercle.

Three families are recognized: Eoastrapostylopidae from the late Paleocene, Trigonostylopidae from the Paleocene-Eocene, and Astrapotheriidae from the Eocene-Miocene. The Brazilian, Itaboraian Tetragonostylops and the Argentinian, Riochican Eoastrapostylops are the oldest astrapotheres. The latter, with its low-crowned and lophoselenodont cheek teeth, is considered the most primitive astrapothere. Trigonostylopids are distinct from other astrapotheres in their ear anatomy but are included in the order because of otherwise similar characters. Antarctodon is one of few eutherian mammals, as well as one of the last known terrestrial vertebrates, found in Antarctica.

The most famous member of the order is undoubtedly Astrapotherium, a 3 m (9.8 ft) long elephant-like animal that had lost its upper incisors and developed ever-growing canine tusks. They had lost their anterior premolars, resulting in a gap between their tusks and the hypsodont cheek teeth. The short and retracted nasal bones indicate a moderately developed tapir-like proboscis. The small Eocene Trigonostylops lacked such retracted nasals and probably also a proboscis. Other astrapotheriids, such as the Casamayoran Scaglia and Albertogaudrya, were between a sheep and a tapir in size and already the largest South American mammals.

== Etymology ==
The name Astrapotheria is derived from the genus Astrapotherium. Astrapotheria means "lightning beasts". The astrapotheres were named in allusion to the brontotheres of North America; "brontothere" means "thunder beast".

== Classification ==
There is no scientific consensus regarding the classification within Astrapotheria. For example, Paula Couto 1963 originally described Tetragonostylops as a trigonostylopid but Soria 1982 and 1984 transferred the genus to Astrapotheriidae and concluded that the remaining two genera in that family, Trigonostylops and Shecenia, form a basal collateral branch within Astrapotheriidae. According to Cifelli 1993, Trigonostylopidae (including Eoastrapostylopidae) is the stem group of Astrapotheriidae.

- Astrapotheriidae Ameghino 1887
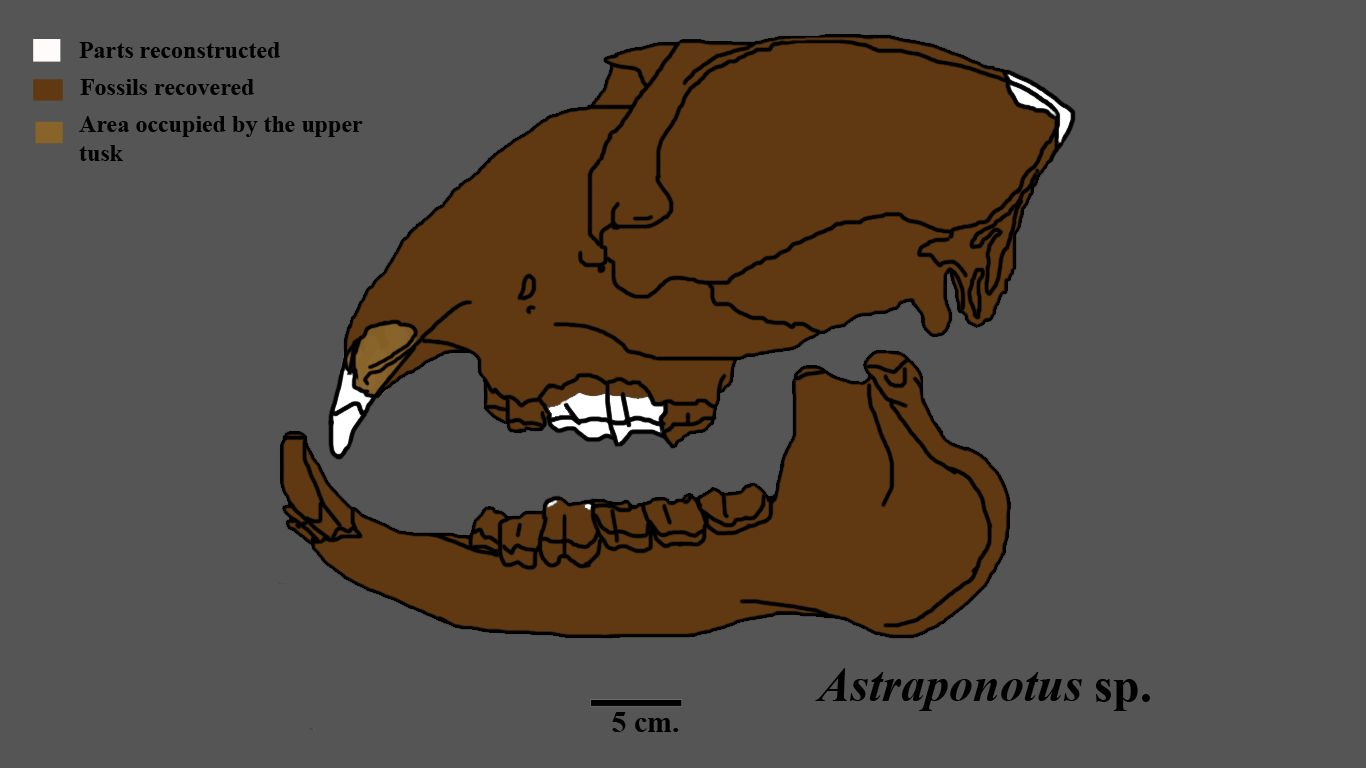
  Reconstructed skull of Astraponotus sp.
  - Albertogaudrya Ameghino 1901
  - Antarctodon Bond et al. 2011
  - Astraponotus Ameghino 1901
  - Astrapothericulus Ameghino 1901
  - Astrapotherium Burmeister 1879
  - Comahuetherium Kramarz & Bond 2011
  - Granastrapotherium Johnson & Madden 1997
  - Hilarcotherium Vallejo-Pareja et al. 2015
  - Liarthrus Ameghino 1897
  - Maddenia Kramarz & Bond 2009
  - Parastrapotherium Ameghino 1895
  - Scaglia Simpson 1957
  - Uruguaytherium Kraglievich 1928
  - Xenastrapotherium Kraglievich 1928
- Eoastrapostylopidae Soria & Powell 1981
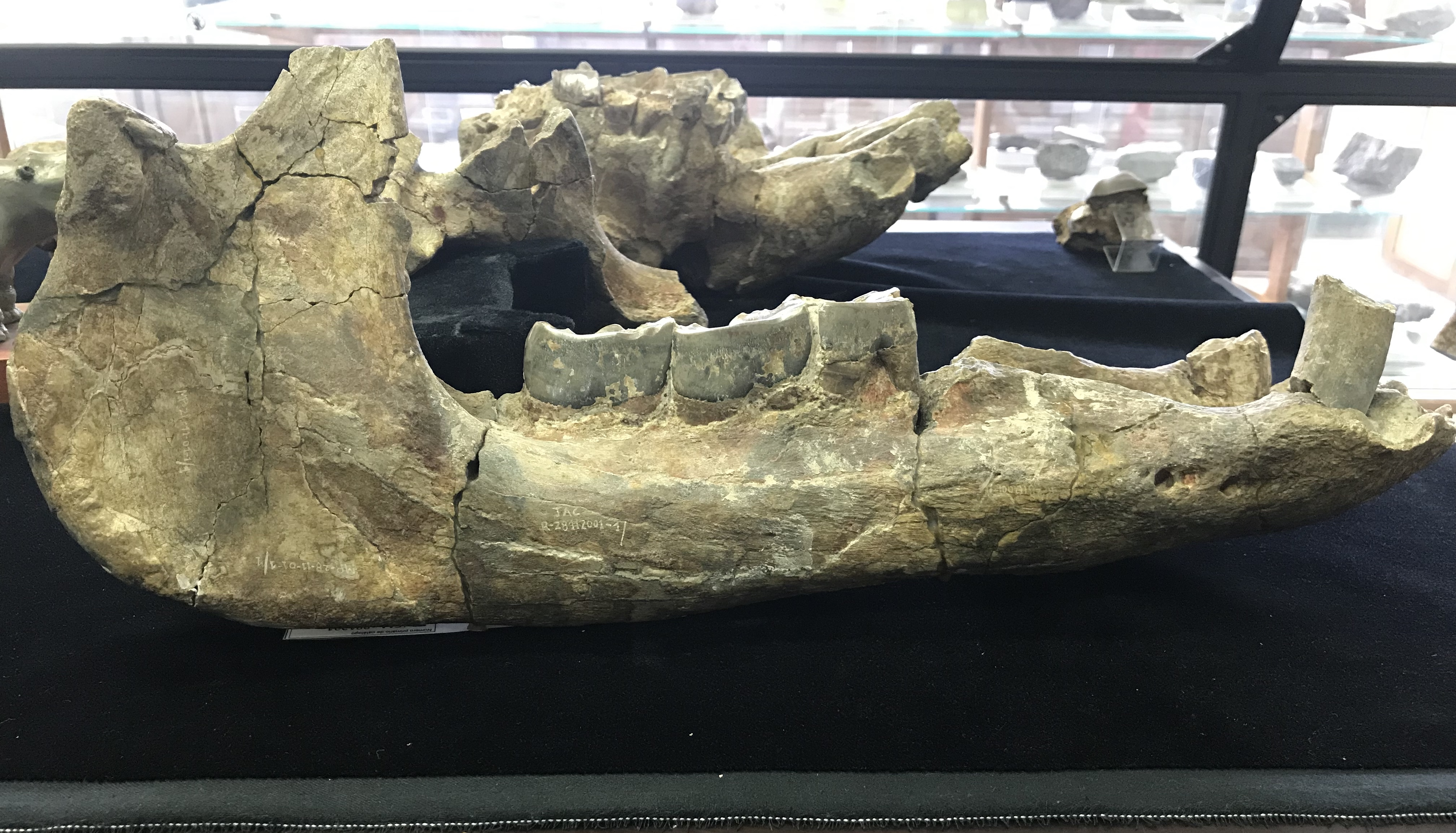
  Jaw of Hilarcotherium castanedaii
  - Eoastrapostylops Soria & Powell 1981
- Trigonostylopidae Ameghino 1901
  - Shecenia Simpson 1935
  - Tetragonostylops Paula Couto 1963
  - Trigonostylops Ameghino 1897
