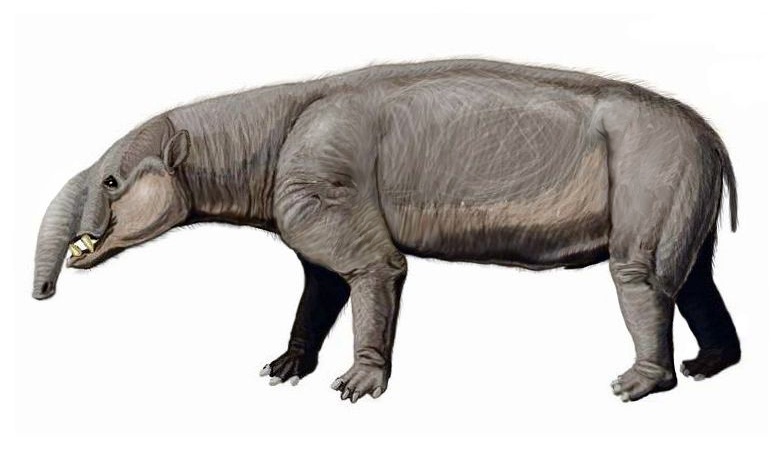
- Life reconstruction of Astrapotherium magnum
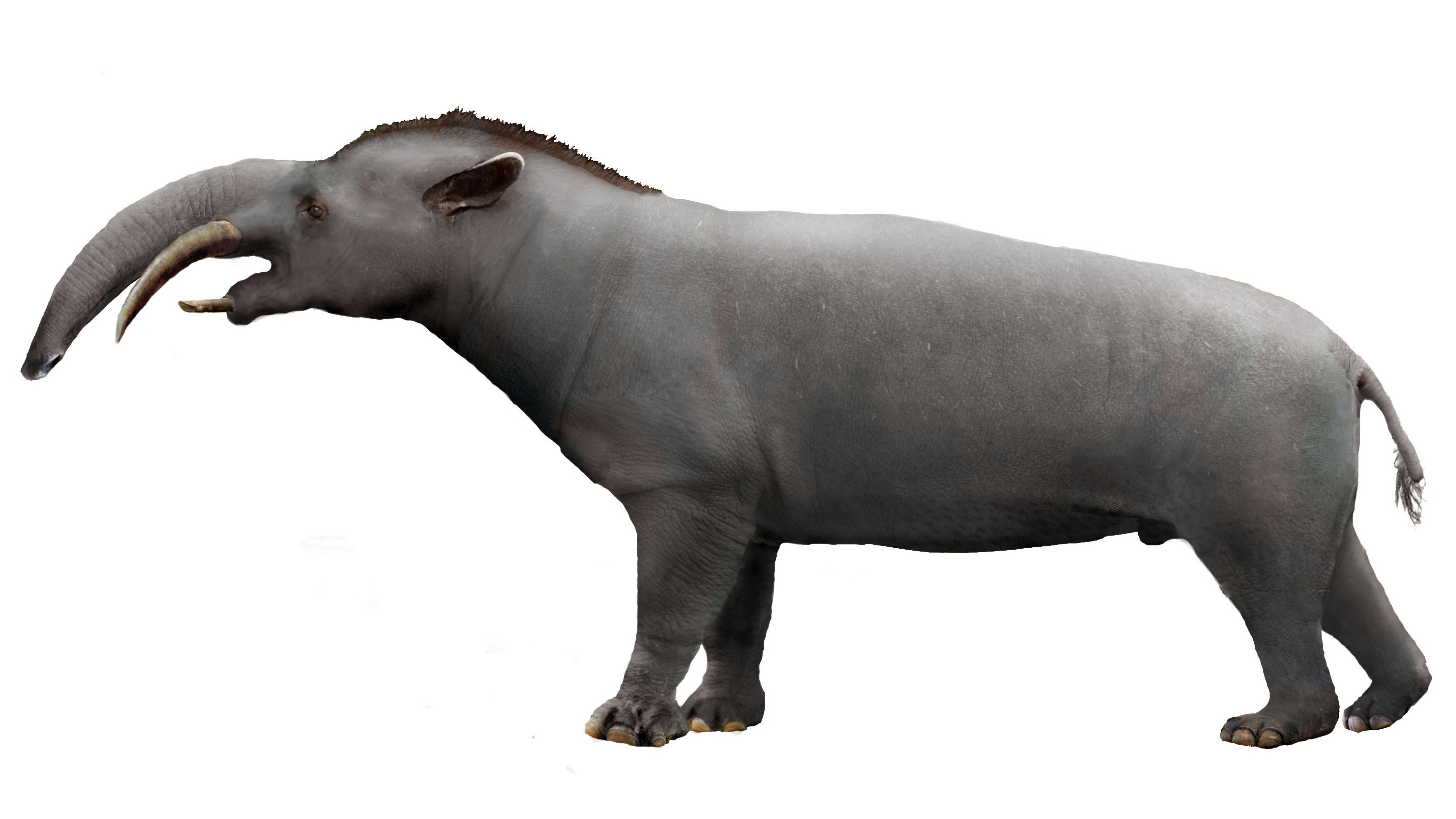
- Life reconstruction of Granastrapotherium snorki

Scientific classification
- Kingdom: Animalia
- Phylum: Chordata
- Class: Mammalia
- Order: †Astrapotheria
- Family: †Astrapotheriidae; Ameghino 1887

Genera
- Astrapotheriinae; Astrapothericulus; Astrapotherium; Scaglia; Albertogaudryinae; Albertogaudrya; Astraponotus; Uruguaytheriinae; Uruguaytherium; Granastrapotherium; Xenastrapotherium; Hilarcotherium; Incertae sedis: Antarctodon; Comahuetherium; Liarthrus; Maddenia; Parastrapotherium

= Astrapotheriidae =

Astrapotheriidae Temporal range: Late Eocene–Late Miocene

Extinct family of mammals

Astrapotheriidae is an extinct family of herbivorous South American land mammals that lived from the Late Eocene (Mustersan SALMA) to the Middle Miocene (Laventan SALMA) 37.71 to 15.98 million years ago. The most derived of the astrapotherians, they were also the largest and most specialized mammals in the Tertiary of South America. There are two sister taxa: Eoastrapostylopidae and Trigonostylopidae.

Around 1900, Argentine paleontologist Florentino Ameghino described eight Colhuehuapian (Early Miocene) species from specimens he found south of Lake Colhué Huapi in Patagonia and grouped them into three genera: Parastrapotherium, Astrapotherium, and Astrapothericulus. It was obvious to Ameghino that these species represented a great diversity, ranging in size from a peccary to a rhinoceros, but his description was based entirely on fragmentary and not always comparable dental remains. Other expeditions to Patagonia have subsequently recovered considerably more complete materials.

== Genera ==
According to Kramarz & Bond 2009, Astrapotheriidae includes two clades, Astrapotheriinae and Uruguaytheriinae, and a number of early genera (Astrapotheriidae incertae sedis): Astraponotus (Middle Eocene), Maddenia (Early Oligocene), and Parastrapotherium (Late Oligocene-Early Miocene). Most genera have been found in Patagonia and adjacent areas in Argentina and Chile; whereas members of Uruguaytheriinae have been found further north: Xenastrapotherium (Late Oligocene-Middle Miocene of northern South America), Granastrapotherium (Middle Miocene of Colombia), Uruguaytherium (uncertain age, from Uruguay). According to Kramarz & Bond 2009, the genus Maddenia is a small, pre-Deseadan form of later astrapotheriids. Simpson 1945 grouped Albertogaudrya together with Astraponotus in the subfamily Albertogaudryinae, synonymous with Albertogaudryidae Ameghino 1901. Bond et al. 2011 concluded that a comprehensive evaluation is required regarding astrapotherids.

- Incertae sedis
  - Parastrapotherium Ameghino 1895
  - Antarctodon Bond et al. 2011
  - Comahuetherium Kramarz & Bond 2011
  - Liarthrus Ameghino 1897
  - Maddenia Kramarz & Bond 2009
- Subfamily Albertogaudryinae Simpson 1945
  - Albertogaudrya Ameghino 1901
  - Astraponotus Ameghino 1901
- Subfamily Astrapotheriinae
  - Astrapothericulus Ameghino 1901
  - Astrapotherium Burmeister 1879
  - Scaglia Simpson 1957
- Subfamily Uruguaytheriinae
  - Uruguaytherium Kraglievich 1928
  - Granastrapotherium Johnson & Madden 1997
  - Xenastrapotherium Kraglievich 1928
  - Hilarcotherium
