= Tarkanian =

Tarkanian, Tarkanyan, Tarkhanian or Tarkhanyan (Armenian: Թարխանյան) is an Armenian surname that may refer to:

- Danny Tarkanian (born 1961), American businessman and politician
- Jerry Tarkanian (1930–2015), American college basketball coach of Armenian ancestry

== See also ==
- Tarkan (disambiguation)
