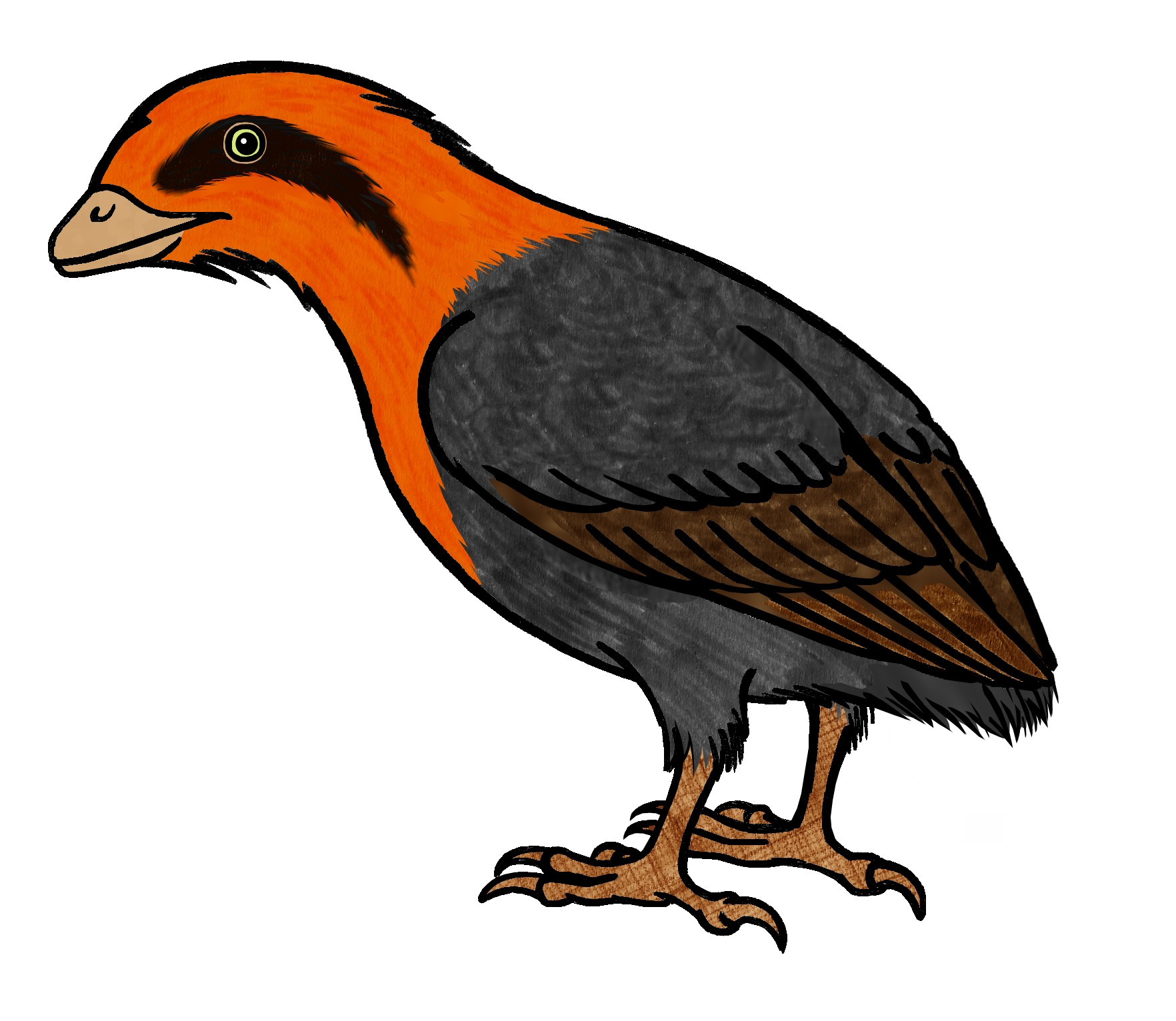
- Life restoration.

Scientific classification
- Kingdom: Animalia
- Phylum: Chordata
- Class: Reptilia
- Clade: Dinosauria
- Clade: Saurischia
- Clade: Theropoda
- Clade: Avialae
- Clade: †Enantiornithes
- Order: †Liaoningornithiformes; Hou, 1996
- Family: †Liaoningornithidae; Hou, 1996
- Genus: †Liaoningornis; Hou, 1996
- Species: †L. longidigitus

Binomial name
- †Liaoningornis longidigitus (Hou, 1996) Hou, 1997

= Liaoningornis =

Liaoningornis Temporal range: Early Cretaceous, 124.6 Ma

Extinct genus of birds

Liaoningornis (meaning "bird of Liaoning" in Greek) is a genus of bird from Lower Cretaceous China. It was collected from the dinosaur-bearing beds of the Sihetun locality, of the Yixian Formation, Shangyuan, near the city of Beipiao in Liaoning province. The only known species is Liaoningornis longidigitris. It was described by Linhai Hou in 1996 and 1997. Longidigitris had been a lapsus calami; Hou emended the name in 1997 to Lioaningornis longidigitus.

The single fossil is an incomplete semi-articulated skeleton the size of a sparrow. It includes both feet, the right leg, the sternum, part of the right arm, and fragmentary coracoids and pubes. Its accession number is IVPP11303. It is in the collection of the Institute of Vertebrate Paleontology and Paleoanthropology in Beijing. It has advanced flight, perching, and respiratory adaptations like a long, deeply keeled sternum, a pair of anterolateral processes on the sternum near the articulations with the coracoids, fused, short, metatarsals, and highly curved pedal claws indicating good perching ability. Hou et al. (1996) described the metatarsals as fused only distally, but Zhou and Hou (2002) revised this analysis, finding that the metatarsus was fused distally and proximally, but not along most of the length.

Zhou and Hou in 2002 considered Liaoningornis to be the oldest known member of the Ornithurae. However, a 2012 re-analysis by Jingmai O'Connor showed that it was in fact an enantiornithean similar to Eoalulavis.
