= Biblián Formation =

Geologic formation in Ecuador

- Stratigraphic range: Early Miocene (Colhuehuapian); ~21–19.2 Ma
- Type: Geological formation
- Underlies: Loyola Formation

Location
- Coordinates: 2.8°S 78.9°W
- Approximate paleocoordinates: 3.5°S 76.0°W
- Region: Cañar Province
- Country: Ecuador
- Extent: Cuenca Basin

Type section
- Named for: Biblián, Biblián Canton
- Biblián Formation (Ecuador)

The Biblián Formation is an Early Miocene (Colhuehuapian in the SALMA classification) geologic formation of the Cuenca Basin in Ecuador. Fossils of the endemic species Xenastrapotherium aequatorialis have been found in the formation. X.aequatorialis It is the oldest species of its genus

== See also ==
- List of fossiliferous stratigraphic units in Ecuador
