= Myomimus igdeliensis =

Myomimus igdeliensis Temporal range: Early Pliocene

Scientific classification
- Domain: Eukaryota
- Kingdom: Animalia
- Phylum: Chordata
- Class: Mammalia
- Order: Rodentia
- Family: Gliridae
- Genus: Myomimus
- Species: †M. igdeliensis

Binomial name
- †Myomimus igdeliensis Suata-Alpaslan, 2009

Extinct species of mammal

Myomimus igdeliensis is an extinct species of Myomimus that inhabited Turkey during the Early Pliocene.
