= Inhibitory cascade =

Dental evo devo model

The inhibitory cascade is a model in evolutionary developmental biology concerning the proportions of mammalian mandibular molar teeth.

== Predictions ==
The mathematical expression used to model the inhibitory cascade is 1 + [(a - i)/i](x - 1), where a is the strength of activating developmental factors, i is the strength of inhibitory developmental factors, and x is the number of the lower molar in the tooth row (i.e. M_{1}, M_{2}, etc.). The M_{2} is always predicted to be exactly one third of the total mandibular molar area in a mammal with the typical eutherian dental formula containing three mandibular molars, with M_{1} = i/3a and M_{3} = (2a - i)/3a.

== Evidence ==
An overview of mammal species across various orders found the large majority of them to occupy either a morphospace where M_{1} > M_{2} > M_{3} or one where M_{1} < M_{2} < M_{3}, concordant with the inhibitory cascade model. Analysis of a broad range of Mesozoic and early Cenozoic mammaliaform taxa found that about two-thirds of them had molar ratios consistent with the inhibitory cascade's predictions, suggesting a deep evolutionary origin within Mammaliaformes for this developmental mechanism; it was almost certainly present in the last common ancestor of therian mammals.
