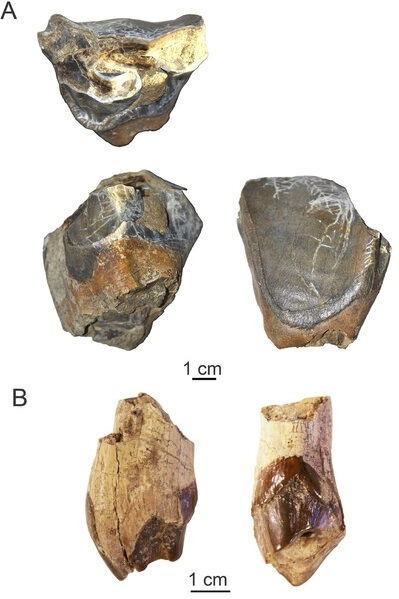
- Astrapothericulus iheringi. A. CPJLO 055, isolated left upper second molar (M2) in occlusal, lingual, and labial views; B. SGO.PV. 22.260, isolated right third upper premolar (P3) in anterior and lingual views.

Scientific classification
- Kingdom: Animalia
- Phylum: Chordata
- Class: Mammalia
- Order: †Astrapotheria
- Family: †Astrapotheriidae
- Subfamily: †Astrapotheriinae
- Genus: †Astrapothericulus; Ameghino, 1902

Type species
- Astrapothericulus iheringi Ameghino, 1902

Species
- A. iheringi Ameghino 1902; A. emarginatus Ameghino 1904

Synonyms
- Astrapothericulus hebetatus Ameghino 1902; Astrapothericulus peninsulatus Ameghino 1904

= Astrapothericulus =

Astrapothericulus Temporal range: Early Miocene ~21–19 Ma

Extinct genus of mammals

Astrapothericulus is an extinct genus of mammals, belonging to the order Astrapotheria. It lived during the Lower Miocene in what is now South America.

== Description ==
This animal was possibly as large as a tapir, and may have looked like them, as it had a short trunk and a robust and elongated body. Compared to its better known relative Astrapotherium, Astrapothericulus was approximately 30% smaller, hence its name, meaning "Small Astrapotherium".

The dental formula was identical to Astrapotherium, but there was some differences in the characteristics of the teeth : the incisors were proportionally narrower and longer, and the lower canines were inserted into the mandible more vertically. The premolars and molars were lower crowned and had larger and a more prominent basal cingulum. The lower molars were similar to Astrapotherium, but vaguely bunodont. The mandibular symphysis was short, narrow and concave, unlike Astrapotherium and Parastrapotherium. The horizontal branch of the mandible was narrower and higher, without the lateral swelling formed by the base of the canine, typical of the two previous genera. The nasal bones were much larger than in Astrapotherium, and with considerable contact with the maxillary bones.

In general, the head of Astrapothericulus was shorter and higher than that of Astrapotherium, and vaguely resembled that of its more ancient relative, Astraponotus.

== Classification ==
The genus Astrapothericulus was first described in 1902 by Florentino Ameghino, based on fossil remains from Argentine Patagonia; the type species is Astrapothericulus iheringi, but the species A. emarginatus and A. peninsulatus, described by Ameghino in 1904, are also assigned to this genus; more recent studies indicate as valid only A. emarginatus and the type species. Fossils of Astrapothericulus are found in the Cerro Bandera Formation of Neuquén Province and in the Pinturas Formation of Santa Cruz Province, in terrains dated to the end of the Lower Miocene.

Astrapothericulus was a member of Astrapotheria, a clade of South American ungulates, vaguely evocating the shape of tapirs or hippopotamus, but not closely related to either of them. Astrapothericulus is considered a specialized member of the family Astrapotheriidae, comprising the more derived forms of the group, and may have been ancestral to the genus Astrapotherium.
