= Tetragonostylops =

Tetragonostylops Temporal range: Late Paleocene ~58–55 Ma

Scientific classification
- Kingdom: Animalia
- Phylum: Chordata
- Class: Mammalia
- Infraclass: Placentalia
- Order: †Astrapotheria
- Family: †Trigonostylopidae
- Genus: †Tetragonostylops; Paula Couto, 1952

Type species
- Tetragonostylops apthomasi Paula Couto, 1952

Species
- T. apthomasi Paula Couto 1952

Extinct genus of mammals

Tetragonostylops is an extinct genus of mammal, related to Astrapotheria. It lived during the Late Paleocene, and its fossils were discovered in South America.

== Description ==
This genus is only known from incomplete remains, notably a well-preserved mandible and a fragmentary skull. Like other astrapotheres, Tetragonostylops may have had a strong elongated body, and a long, flat skull. The skull was 20 centimeters long, and the entire body was supposedly one meter long. Its mandible was strong, and endowed with an elongated cylindrical symphysis. The mandibular condyle was elevated, and the coronoid process was high, but lower than in its relative Trigonostylops. The shape of their molars was different, with Tetragonostylops having more squared molars (hence his name, Tetragon- meaning "four corners"), and had an infraorbital canal, which does not appear in Trigonostylops. The molars were brachyodont, like those of Trigonostylops, and the canines were strong and large. There was a large diastema between the canines and the premolars.

== Classification ==
The first fossils from the genus were discovered in the Itaboraí Formation of Brazil, and were ascribed to the genus Trigonostylops by Carlos de Paula Couto, as T. apthomasi. Subsequently, the same scholar recognized fundamental differences with the Eocene species of Trigonostylops, and therefore created a new genus, Tetragonostylops, for the Brazilian Paleocene species. Despite its antiquity, Tetragonostylops may have been more derived than its relative, and may have been ancestral to other genera of astrapotheres such as Albertogaudrya and Scaglia. Tetragonostylops and Trigonostylops are considered members of Trigonostylopidae, a possibly paraphyletic family of astrapotheres, including more derived forms such as Shecenia.

== Bibliography ==
- C. de Paula Couto. 1952. Fossil mammals from the beginning of the Cenozoic in Brazil. Condylarthra, Litopterna, Xenungulata, and Astrapotheria. Bulletin of the American Museum of Natural History 99(6):355-394
- C. de Paula Couto. 1963. Um Trigonostylopidae do Paleoceno do Brasil. Anais da Academia Brasileira de Ciências 35(3):339-351
- Soria, M. F. (1982). "Tetragonostylops apthomasi (Price y Paula Couto, 1950): su asignación a Astrapotheriidae (Mammalia; Astrapotheria)". Ameghiniana. 19 (3–4): 234–238.
- Vallejo-Pareja, M. C.; Carrillo, J. D.; Moreno-Bernal, J. W.; Pardo-Jaramillo, M.; Rodriguez-Gonzalez, D. F.; Muñoz-Duran, J. (2015). "Hilarcotherium castanedaii, gen. et sp. nov., a new Miocene astrapothere (Mammalia, Astrapotheriidae) from the Upper Magdalena Valley, Colombia". Journal of Vertebrate Paleontology. 35 (2): e903960. doi:10.1080/02724634.2014.903960.
