= Comahuetherium =

Comahuetherium Temporal range: Early Miocene (Colhuehuapian) ~21.0–17.5 Ma

Scientific classification
- Domain: Eukaryota
- Kingdom: Animalia
- Phylum: Chordata
- Class: Mammalia
- Order: †Astrapotheria
- Family: †Astrapotheriidae
- Genus: †Comahuetherium; Kramarz & Bond 2011

Type species
- †Comahuetherium coccaorum Kramarz & Bond 2011

Extinct genus of mammals

Comahuetherium is an extinct genus of astrapotherian mammal from the Early Miocene (Colhuehuapian age). It is a basal astrapotheriid which lived in what is now Patagonia, Argentina. The holotype was found in the Cerro Bandera Formation in Neuquén Province, northern Patagonia and additional specimens were found at the Gran Barranca south of Lake Colhué Huapi, in Chubut Province of central Patagonia. It was first named by Alejandro Kramarz and Mariano Bond in 2011 and the type species is Comahuetherium coccaorum.
