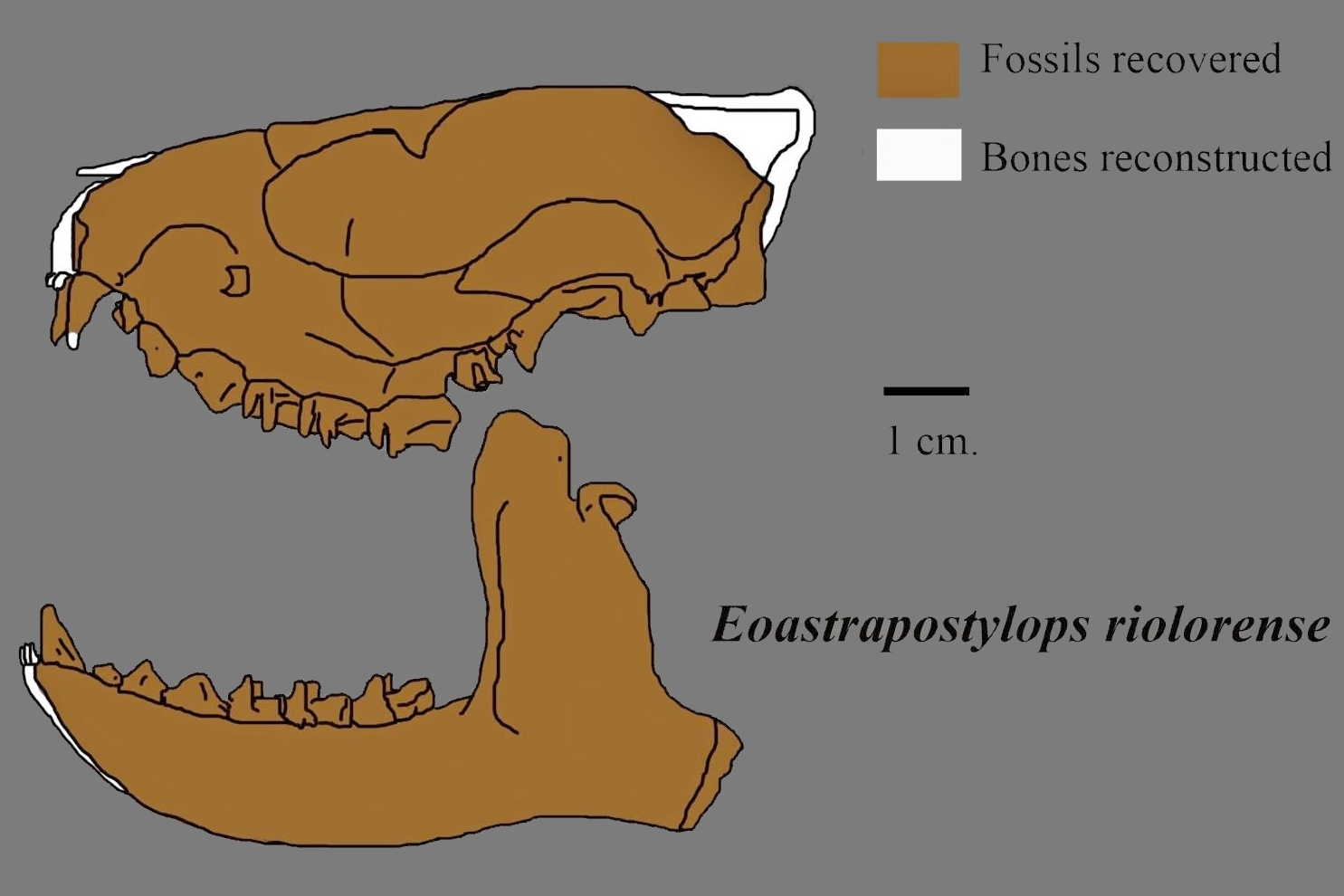
- Skull of Eoastrapostylops

Scientific classification
- Kingdom: Animalia
- Phylum: Chordata
- Class: Mammalia
- Infraclass: Placentalia
- Order: †Astrapotheria
- Family: †Eoastrapostylopidae
- Genus: †Eoastrapostylops; Soria & Powell 1981

Type species
- Eoastrapostylops riolorense Soria & Powell, 1981

Species
- E. riolorense Soria & Powell 1981

= Eoastrapostylops =

Eoastrapostylops Temporal range: Late Paleocene (Peligran) ~59–56 Ma

Extinct genus of astrapotheres

Eoastrapostylops is an extinct genus of astrapothere that lived during the Late Paleocene in what is now Argentina.

== Description ==
This animal was small in size; the skull was 9 centimeters long and the total length of the animal probably just exceeded half a meter. Eoastrapostylops possessed a short muzzle; its canines were well developed but not yet derived into large fangs, as was the case in later South American ungulates such as Trigonostylops, and the nasal bones were not retracted, indicating the absence of the typical proboscis exhibited by later forms.

The dentition of Eoastrapostylops recalls that of its later relative, Trigonostylops. molars and premolars were low-crowned and lophoselenodont-shaped. The fourth premolar was molarized, while both the fourth upper premolar and the third upper molar were triangularly shaped and lacked an hypoconus.

== Classification ==
Eoastrapostylops riolorense was first described in 1981, based on fossils found in the Rio Loro Formation, in the Tucuman Province of Argentina. The authors immediately identified the traits of a primitive astrapothere, and therefore established the family Eoastrapostylopidae.

More recent researches have brought to light notable similarities between the auditory regions of Eoastrapostylops and those of archaic "condylarths" and litopterns. Those researches would indicate that Eoastrapostylops was one of the most basal member of the South American ungulates, and differentiated before the separation between astrapotheres, pyrothere and notoungulates.
