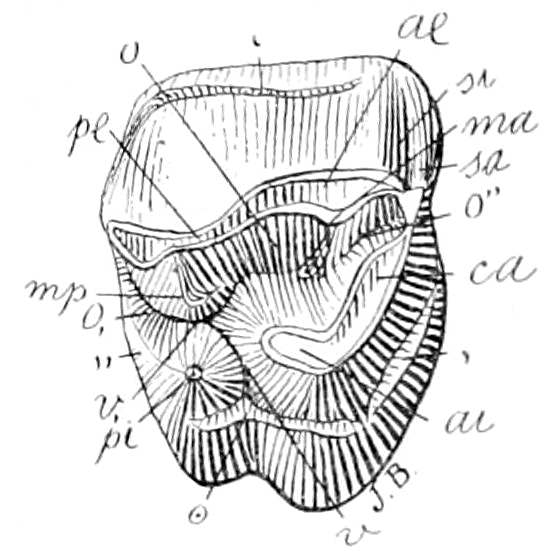
- Albertogaudrya unica

Scientific classification
- Kingdom: Animalia
- Phylum: Chordata
- Class: Mammalia
- Order: †Astrapotheria
- Family: †Astrapotheriidae
- Genus: †Albertogaudrya; Ameghino, 1901

Species
- A. unica (type) Ameghino 1901; A. carahuasensis Carbajal et al. 1977

= Albertogaudrya =

Albertogaudrya Temporal range: Mid-Late Eocene (Casamayoran-Divisaderan) ~48.6–37.2 Ma

Extinct genus of astrapotherian mammal

Albertogaudrya is an extinct genus of astrapotherian mammal that lived in present-day Patagonia and Salta, Argentina (25.8°S 65.4°W, paleocoordinates 28.2°S 55.9°W) during the Eocene (Casamayoran SALMA) 48.6 to 37.2 million years ago. Fossils of Albertogaudrya have been found in the Lumbrera and Sarmiento Formations. It is named after French palaeontologist Albert Gaudry.

== Species ==
A. carahuasensis differs from A. unica in having smaller premolars, with m1 having longer talonid and wider trigonid, p3-m1 with shallower external sulci and lacking cingulae, and less curved hypolophid. A. carahuasensis is known from a fragmentary mandible.
