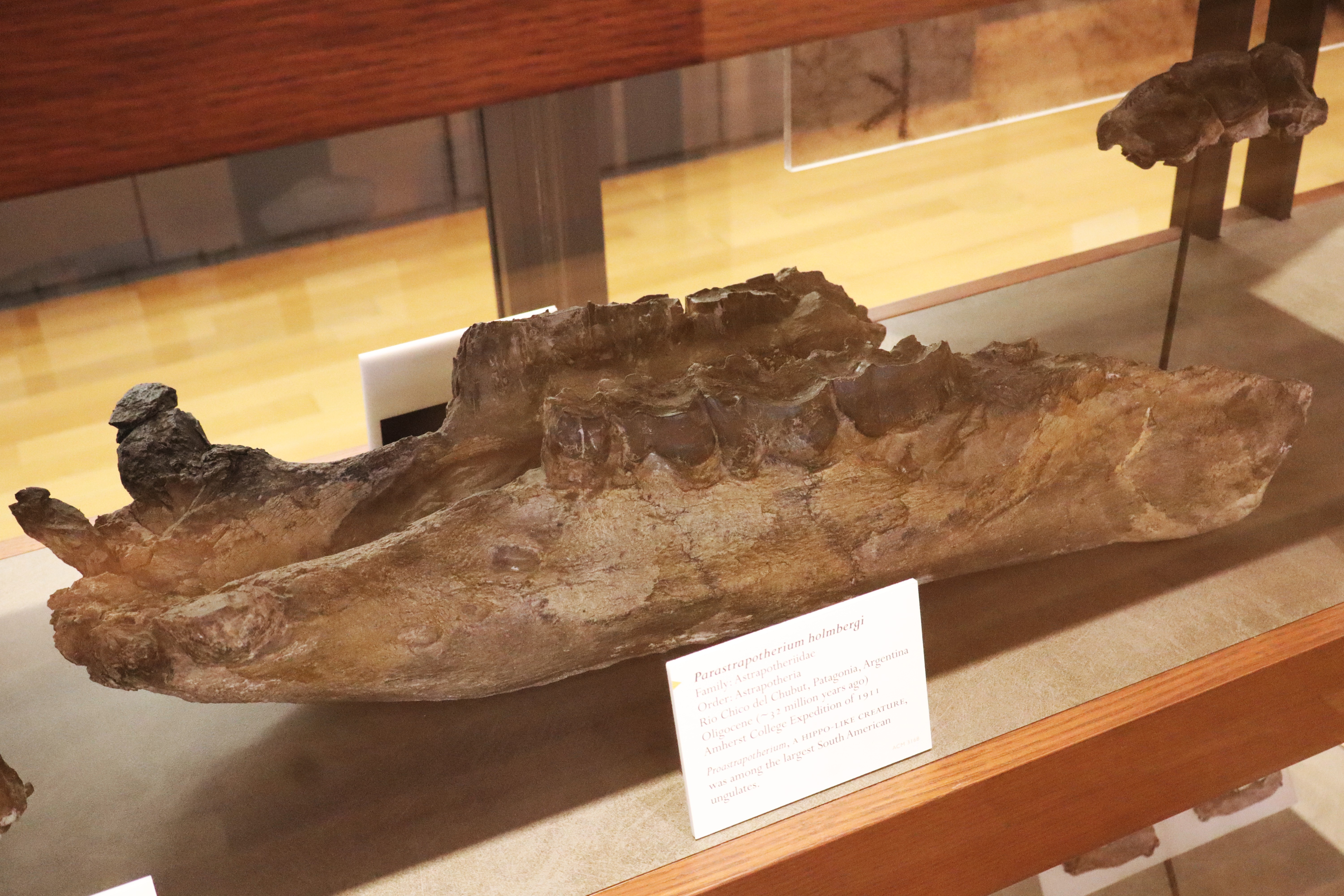
- P. holmbergi jaw, Beneski Museum of Natural History

Scientific classification
- Kingdom: Animalia
- Phylum: Chordata
- Class: Mammalia
- Infraclass: Placentalia
- Order: †Astrapotheria
- Family: †Astrapotheriidae
- Genus: †Parastrapotherium; Ameghino 1895

Species
- See text

= Parastrapotherium =

Parastrapotherium Temporal range: Late Oligocene-Early Miocene (Deseadan-Colhuehuapian) ~23–17.5 Ma

Extinct genus of mammals

Parastrapotherium is an extinct genus of South American land mammal that existed from the Late Oligocene (Deseadan SALMA) to the Early Miocene (Colhuehuapian SALMA). The genus includes some of the largest and smallest known astrapotherians, but As of 2008 has no generally recognized description.

== Description ==
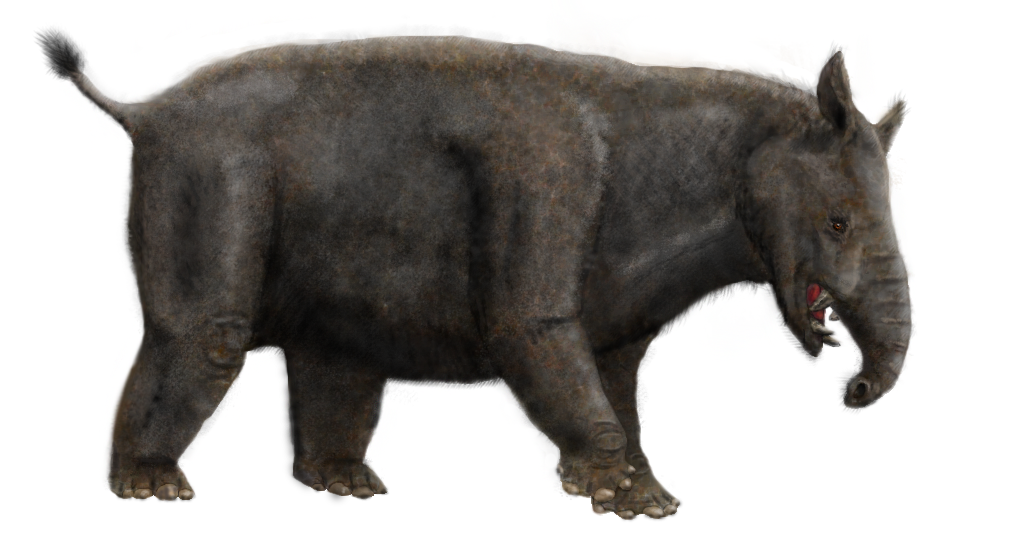
Reconstruction of Parastrapotherium sp.

The genus was first described by Amagehino in 1895. He distinguished it from the Santacrucian (late Early Miocene) Astrapotherium based on the greater number of upper and lower molars. Although later researchers disagreed and concluded that Ameghino based his conclusion on very fragmentary materials, they mostly agreed to distinguish the genus from other groups of astrapotherians. In the mandibular canine of Parastrapotherium, the microstructure of the tooth enamel is characterised by vertical decussation with enamel prism zones bending in an undulatory pattern.

== Species ==
The following species have been recognised:

- Parastrapotherium cingulatum Ameghino, 1894
- Parastrapotherium ephebicum Ameghino, 1894
- Parastrapotherium holmbergi Ameghino, 1894
- Parastrapotherium lemoinei Ameghino, 1894
- Parastrapotherium trouessarti Ameghino, 1894

== Distribution ==
Fossils of Parastrapotherium have been found in:

Oligocene

- Deseado Formation, Argentina
- Sarmiento Formation, Argentina

Miocene

- Cerro Bandera Formation, Argentina
- Sarmiento Formation, Argentina

== Palaeobiology ==
The microstructural details of its long bones indicate that Parastrapotherium was specialised for graviportal locomotion.
