= Thadanius =

Thadanius Temporal range: Late Oligocene ~28–24 Ma

Scientific classification
- Domain: Eukaryota
- Kingdom: Animalia
- Phylum: Chordata
- Class: Mammalia
- Order: †Litopterna
- Family: †Adianthidae
- Subfamily: †Adianthinae
- Genus: †Thadanius; Cifelli & Soria 1983

Type species
- Thadanius hoffstetteri Cifelli & Soria, 1983

Species
- T. hoffstetteri Cifelli & Soria 1983

Extinct genus of litopterns

Thadanius is an extinct genus of Litoptern, belonging to the family Adianthidae. It lived during the Late Oligocene, in what is today Bolivia.

== Description ==
Only known from the fossilized remains of its mandible and teeth, this animal may have been similar to its relatives Adianthus and Adiantoides, and probably was a small animal, the size of a small dog and slender in build. Thadanius was characterized by moderately high crowned teeth; the lower molars were devoid of anterior cingulum, while the hypoconulid was not expanded as in other contemporary Adianthidae, such as Tricoelodus and Proadiantus to form a third lobe on the third molar. The entoconid did not reach the apex of the hypoconulid, but was connected to an hypoconulid-entoconid crest, and a rudimentary entolophid was present, especially on the third lower molar. There was no basin on the lower third molar.

== Classification ==
Thadanius was a member of the Adianthidae, a clade of small-sized litopterns that went extinct during the Miocene period. Thadanius shares similarities with Proadiantus, and they may have been related, as Tricoelodus.

Thadanius was first described in 1983, based on fragmentary remains from the Salla Formation, in the Loayza Province of Bolivia, in terrains dated from the Late Oligocene. Its name is an anagram of Adianthus, the eponymous genus of Adianthidae.
