= Victorlemoinea =

Victorlemoinea Temporal range: Early Eocene-Late Eocene (Itaboraian-Divisaderan) ~53–37.2 Ma

Scientific classification
- Kingdom: Animalia
- Phylum: Chordata
- Class: Mammalia
- Infraclass: Placentalia
- Order: †Litopterna
- Family: †Sparnotheriodontidae
- Genus: †Victorlemoinea; Ameghino 1901

Species
- †V. labyrinthica Ameghino 1901 (type); †V. emarginata Ameghino 1901; †V. prototypica Paula Couto 1952; †?V. longidens (Ameghino 1901)

Extinct genus of litopterns

Victorlemoinea is an extinct litoptern genus of the family Sparnotheriodontidae, that lived from the Early to Middle Eocene. Fossils of Victorlemoinea have been found in the Las Flores, Sarmiento and Koluel Kaike Formations of Argentina, the Itaboraí Formation of Brazil and La Meseta Formation, Antarctica.

== Description ==
Victorlemoinea was a medium-sized litoptern. Sparnotheriodon, Victorlemoinea, and one species of Notiolofos, N. arquinotiensis, have been estimated to have had masses of roughly 400 kg (880 lb), whereas another species of Notiolofos, N. regueroi, was smaller, with a body mass estimated to have been between 25 and 58 kg, making them one of the largest litopterns of the Paleogene. Litopterns would not retain such sizes again until the Miocene.

== Taxonomy ==
This animal is considered a member of the family Sparnotheriodontidae and is said to share some features with the mammal family Didolodontidae. Fossils referable to the genus have been found on Seymour Island, Antarctica.

Victorlemoinea was first named by Florentino Ameghino in 1901 on the basis of a mandible and teeth from the Sarmiento Formation of Argentina, with the type species being Victorlemoinea labyrinthica. In 1952, Carlos de Paula Couto named a new species of Victorlemoinea from the Itaboraí Formation of Brazil, V. prototypica. In 1983, Richard Cifelli tentatively synonymized Sparnotheriodon with Victorlemoinea, however, many other authors view the former as distinct.

The following cladogram is based on Chimento & Agnolin, 2020, showing the position of Victorlemoinea.

- Panperissodactyla
  - - Pucanodus
    - Simoclaenus
    - Molinodus
    - Tiuclaenus
    - - †Didolodontidae
        - Didolodus
        - - - Lamegoia
            - Depaulacoutia
          - - Asmithwoodwardia
            - - Miguelsoria
              - Protolipterna
      - - †Litopterna
          - Victorlemoinea
          - - Adiantoides
            - - Theosodon
              - - Cramauchenia
                - - Diadiaphorus
                  - Tetramerorhinus
        - Perissodactyla
          - - †Escribania
            - - - †Nakusia
                - †Cambaytherium
              - - †Pilgrimella
                - †Anthracobune
          - - crown-Perissodactyla
