= La Meseta Formation =

Geological formation and major fossil site in Antarctica

- Stratigraphic range: Late Paleocene to Early Oligocene
- Type: Geological formation
- Unit of: Seymour Island Group
- Underlies: Weddell Formation
- Overlies: López de Bertodano, Sobral & Cross Valley Formations
- Thickness: 557 m (1,827 ft)

Lithology
- Primary: Sandstone, claystone
- Other: Siltstone, mudstone, conglomerate

Location
- Coordinates: 64°14′21.782″S 56°36′11.69″W.
- Approximate paleocoordinates: 63.7°S 61.5°W
- Region: Seymour Island
- Country: Antarctica
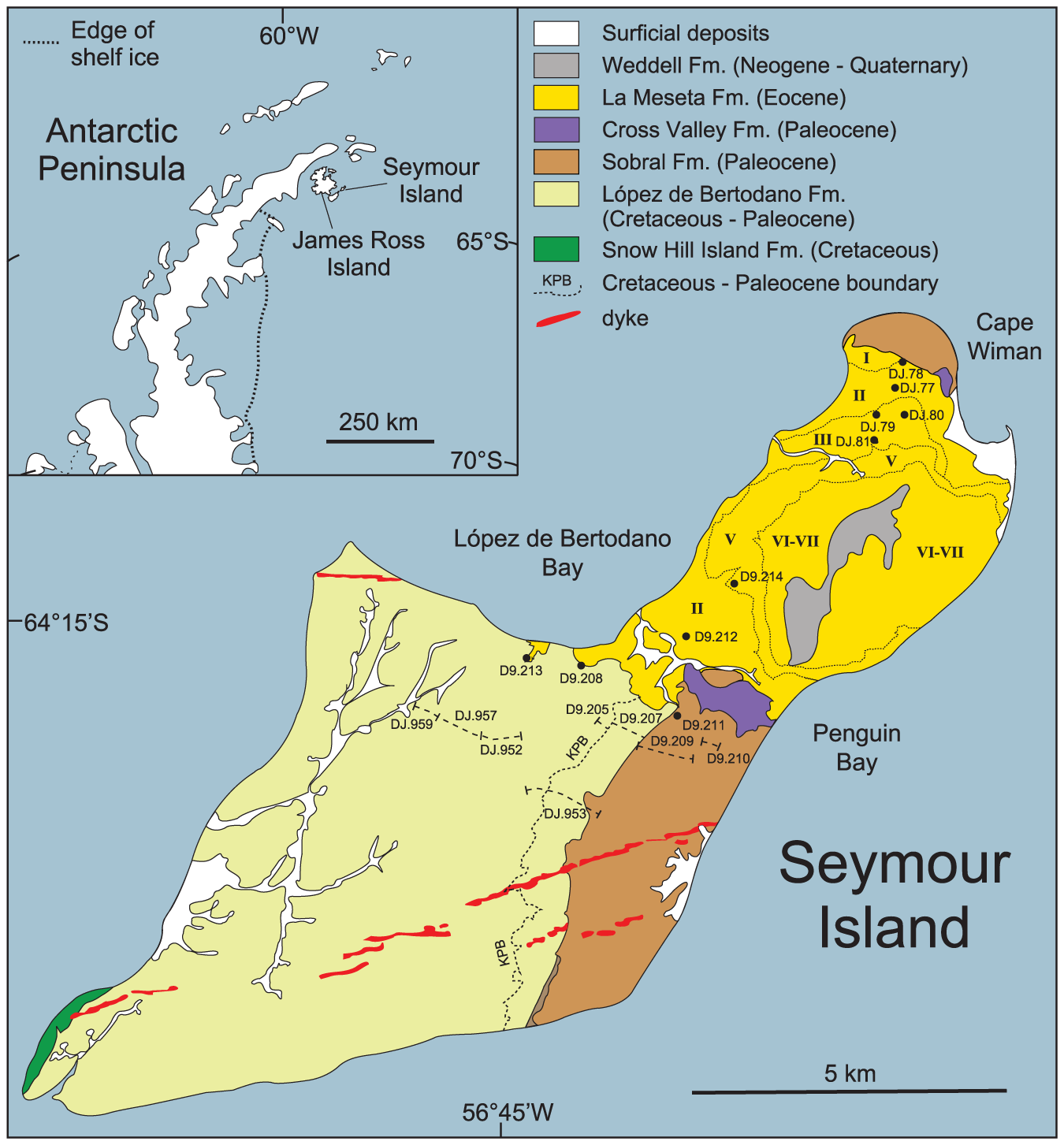
- Geologic map of Seymour Island, Antarctica with La Meseta Formation in dark yellow

The La Meseta Formation is a sedimentary sequence deposited during much of the Paleogene on Seymour Island off the coast of the Antarctic Peninsula. It is noted for its fossils, which include both marine organisms and the only terrestrial vertebrate fossils from the Cenozoic of Antarctica.

In some treatments, the La Meseta Formation is restricted to just the older Thanetian to Lutetian-aged strata, with the younger Bartonian to Rupelian strata treated as the overlying Submeseta Formation. However, other papers instead treat the Submeseta Formation as an allomember of the La Meseta Formation.

== Description ==
La Meseta Formation lies unconformably on the Cretaceous López de Bertodano Formation. It is an approximately 557 metres (1,827 ft) thick sequence of poorly consolidated sandstones and siltstones. The depositional environment was probably coastal, deltaic or estuarine in character. The top of the sequence is an erosional unconformity to Pleistocene glacial gravels. La Meseta Formation is one of the sequences that make up the fill of the Late Jurassic to Paleogene James Ross Basin.

== Paleoenvironment ==
The terrestrial environment surrounding the deposition area is thought to have been a temperate polar forest, including podocarp and araucarian conifers, as well as Nothofagus. Most of the fossilized woods and flowers discovered on Seymour Islands consist of extinct species of conifer trees and lilies during warm climate.

== Paleobiota ==
La Meseta Formation is extremely rich in fossils. Among mammals, the meridiungulata Antarctodon and Trigonostylops have been found in the formation. as well as marsupial Derorhynchidae, Microbiotheria, and polydolopimorphia. It is famous for its penguin fossils, for example the two genera Archaeospheniscus and Palaeeudyptes. Other bird fossils include Dasornis, a genus of pseudotooth birds. There is also an abundance of trace fossils. Diplocraterion, Helminthopsis, Muensteria, Oichnus, Ophiomorpha, Skolithos, Teredolites and Zapfella have been described. Over 35 species and 26 families of fish, which includes sharks, have been described from the Ypresian Cucullaea bed.

=== Mammals ===
Color key: Taxon / Reclassified taxon / Taxon falsely reported as present / Dubious taxon or junior synonym / Ichnotaxon / Ootaxon / Morphotaxon	Notes; Uncertain or tentative taxa are in small text; ~~crossed out~~ taxa are discredited.

==== Meridiungulata ====
Astrapotheria

Taxa	Species	Locality	Stratigraphic position	Material	Notes	Images
Antarctodon	A. sobrali	Locality DVP 2/84 and IAA 1/90.	Cucullaea I allomember (Telm 5).	MLP 08-XI-30-1, an isolated right p4 or m1.	An astrapothere	
Trigonostylops	T. sp.		Cucullaea I allomember (Telm 5).		An astrapothere	

Litopterna

Taxa	Species	Locality	Stratigraphic position	Material	Notes	Images
Notiolofos	N. arquinotiensis	Locality IAA 1/13 and DPV 16/84.	Acantilados II, Campamento, Cucullaea I Allomember (Telm 4) and Submeseta Member (Telm 7).	A Brachyodont lower right molar fragment, probably m1 or m2, preserves a portion of the talonid with most of the lingual side (MLP 13-I-25-1) and left M3 incomplete (MLP 95-I-10-6).	A sparnotheriodontid litoptern.	
Notiolofos	N. regueroi	Locality IAA 2/16	Lower coquina bed of Cucullaea I Allomember.	IAA-PV 173, Isolated complete left m3.	A sparnotheriodontid litoptern.	
Victorlemoinea	V. sp.		Cucullaea I allomember (Telm 5).		A sparnotheriodontid litoptern.	

==== Cetaceans ====
Taxa	Species	Locality	Stratigraphic position	Material	Notes	Images
Basilosauridae	Indeterminate					
Llanocetus	L. denticrenatus	Locality DPV 10/84 and DVP 13/24.	Unit III Member and Telm 7.	A partial mandible with two teeth (specimen USNM 183022) and an endocast of the braincase.	A toothed baleen whale.	

==== Metatherians ====
Derorhynchidae

Taxa	Species	Locality	Stratigraphic position	Material	Notes	Images
Derorhynchus	D. minutus	Locality IAA 1/90.	Allomember Cucullaea I (Telm 5).	MLP 96-1-5-44, incomplete right horizontal ramus of the dentary fragment with m2-3.		
Pauladelphys	P. juanjoi	Locality IAA 2/95 and IAA 1/90.	Allomember Cucullaea I (Telm 5).	An isolated lower molar (MLP 95-1-10-2) and an upper left molar (MLP 96-1-5-44).		
Xenostylos	X. peninsularis	Locality IAA 1/90.	Allomember Cucullaea I (Telm 5).	MLP 94-111-15-10, an isolated upper right molar.		

Microbiotheria

Taxa	Species	Locality	Stratigraphic position	Material	Notes	Images
Marambiotherium	M. glacialis	Locality IAA 1/90 and RV-8200.	Cucullaea I allomember (Telm 5).	MLP 95-1-10-1, a fragment of a right mandibular ramus with a complete m4 and the posterior alveolus of m3 and MLP 88-1-1-1, an edentulous left mandibular ramus with the alveoli for p3-m4.	A microbiothere, related to the modern monito del monte.	
Woodburnodon	W. casei	Locality IAA 1/95.	Cucullaea I allomember (Telm 5).	MLP 04-III-1-2, an isolated, worn upper right molar (M2 or M3).	A microbiothere, related to the modern monito del monte.	

Polydolopimorphia

Taxa	Species	Locality	Stratigraphic position	Material	Notes	Images
Antarctodolops	A. dailyi	Locality IAA 2/95, DPV 2/84, and DPV 6/84.	Cucullaea I allomember (Telm 5).	UCR 20910, a left dentary with p3-m2.	A polydolopimorphian metatherian.	
Antarctodolops	A. mesetaense	Locality IAA 1/90 and DPV 6/84.	Cucullaea I allomember (Telm 5).	Right dentary fragments.	A polydolopimorphian metatherian.	
Perrodelphys	P. coquinense	Locality IAA 1/90.	Cucullaea I allomember (Telm 5).	MLP 96-1-5-11, an isolated left lower molar.	A polydolopimorphian metatherian.	
Polydolops	P. dailyi	Locality IAA 1/90 & DPV 3/84.	Cucullaea I allomember (Telm 5).		A polydolopimorphian metatherian.	
Polydolops	P. seymouriensis	Locality IAA 1/90 & DPV 3/84.	Cucullaea I allomember (Telm 5).		A polydolopimorphian metatherian.	
Polydolops	P. thomasi	Locality IAA 1/90 & DPV 3/84.	Cucullaea I allomember (Telm 5).		A polydolopimorphian metatherian.	
Pujatodon	P. ektopos	Locality IAA 1/90.	Cucullaea I Allomember (Telm 5).	Specimen MLP 14-I-10-20, a lower left molar (m2 or m3) partially worn.	A polydolopimorphian metatherian.	

==== Other mammals ====
Taxa	Species	Locality	Stratigraphic position	Material	Notes	Images
Sudamerica	S. ameghinoi	Locality IAA 1/90 upper level.	Cucullaea I Allomember.	MLP 95-I-10-5, anterior part of a left dentary with the rodent-like incisor partially preserved.	A gondwanathere	
Meridiolestida?	Indeterminate	Locality IAA 1/90 upper level.	Cucullaea I Allomember.	A single tooth, now lost.		
Xenarthra?	Indeterminate.	Locality S124.	Cucullaea I Allomember/ Telm 4.	TMM 44190-1, left metacarpal II and A phalanx and a partial tooth		

=== Birds ===
==== Sphenisciformes ====
Taxa	Species	Locality	Stratigraphic position	Material	Notes	Images
Anthropornis	A. grandis	Locality IAA 4/12, IAA 1/90, DPV 13/84, and DVP 2/84.	Telm 4 member, Telm 7 member, and Submeseta Allomember.	Humerus: MLP 93-X-1-4 (proximal epiphysis), MLP 82-IV-23-4 (proximal epiphysis), MLP 83-I-1-190(proximal epiphysis) and MLP 88-I-1-463(proximal epiphysis).	A giant penguin.	Anthropornis Palaeeudyptes
Anthropornis	A. nordenskjoldi		Submeseta Allomember.	Humerus: MLP CX-60-25 (proximal epiphysis), MLP 83-V-30-5 (diaphysis) and MLP 93-X-1-104(complete humerus).	A giant penguin.	Anthropornis Palaeeudyptes
Archaeospheniscus	A. lopdelli		Submeseta Allomember.		A giant penguin.	Anthropornis Palaeeudyptes
Archaeospheniscus	A. wimani		Submeseta Allomember.		A giant penguin.	Anthropornis Palaeeudyptes
Delphinornis	D. arctowskii	DPV 14/84	Cucullaea I Allomember (Telm 7).		A penguin.	Anthropornis Palaeeudyptes
Delphinornis	D. graclis	DPV 14/84	Cucullaea I Allomember (Telm 7).		A penguin.	Anthropornis Palaeeudyptes
Delphinornis	D. larseni	DPV 13/84 and DPV 14/84.	Cucullaea I Allomember (Telm 5 and Telm 7) and Submeseta Allomember.		A penguin.	Anthropornis Palaeeudyptes
Marambiornis	M. exilis	DVP 2/84, IAA 1/12, and ZPAL 4	Telm 7 Member.	A limb element (right tarsometatarsus).	A penguin.	Anthropornis Palaeeudyptes
Mesetaornis	M. polaris		Telm 7 member.	A nearly complete right femur and two distal left tibiotarsi.	A penguin.	Anthropornis Palaeeudyptes
Orthopteryx	O. gigas				A penguin.	Anthropornis Palaeeudyptes
Palaeeudyptes	P. antarcticus		Cucullaea I Allomember (Telm 3, Telm 4, Telm 5, and Telm 7) and Submeseta Allomember.		A giant penguin.	Anthropornis Palaeeudyptes
Palaeeudyptes	P. gunnari	DVP 2/84, DVP 10/84, DVP 13/84, DVP 14/84, DVP 15/84, and ZPAL 4.	Cucullaea I Allomember (Telm 3, Telm 5, and Telm 7) and Submeseta Allomember.	Multiple specimens consist of coracoids, ulna, and humerus.	A giant penguin.	Anthropornis Palaeeudyptes
Palaeeudyptes	P. klekowskii	DVP 2/84, DVP 10/84, DVP 13/84, DVP 14/84, DVP 16/84, and ZPAL 4.	Cucullaea I Allomember (Telm 3, Telm 5, and Telm 7) and Submeseta Allomember.	Several specimens consist of humerus, coracoid, ulna, and tibiotarsus.	A giant penguin.	Anthropornis Palaeeudyptes
Wimanornis	W. seymourensis	DPV 14/84.	Cucullaea I Allomember (Telm 7) and Submeseta Allomember.		A penguin.	Anthropornis Palaeeudyptes
Tonniornis	T. mesetaensis	DPV 14/84.	Cucullaea I Allomember (Telm 7) and Submeseta Allomember.		A penguin.	Anthropornis Palaeeudyptes
Tonniornis	T. minimum	DPV 14/84.	Cucullaea I Allomember (Telm 7) and Submeseta Allomember.		A penguin.	Anthropornis Palaeeudyptes

==== Other birds ====
Taxa	Species	Locality	Stratigraphic position	Material	Notes	Images
Antarctoboenus	A. carlinii	IAA 2/95 locality	Cucullaea I Allomember	MLP 95-I-10-8, distal end of left tarsometatarsus	A stem falconiform.	
Dasornis	D. sp.			An articular fragment of lower jaw.	A pseudotooth bird.	
?Diomedeidae	Indeterminate	DPV 6/84	Cucullaea I Allomember	Tarsometatarsus with missing distal end.	A potential albatross.	
Notoleptos	N. giglii	DPV 16/84	Submeseta III Allomember	Left tarsometatarsus (MLP 12-I-20-305)	An early albatross.	
?Phorusrhacidae	Indeterminate	Locality IAA 2/13	Cucullaea I Allomember	A right ungual phalanx (MLP-PV 13-XI-28-546) and an incomplete ungual phalanx (MLP-PV 14-I-10-199)	A large-sized potential terror bird.	
?Procellariidae	Indeterminate		Cucullaea I Allomember	Distal end of ulna (MLP 91-II-4-6)	A potential procellarid.	
?Threskiornithidae	Indeterminate		Cucullaea II Allomember (Telm 6)	A fragmentary, curved bill (IB/P/B-0698).	A potential ibis.	

=== Reptiles ===
Taxa	Species	Locality	Stratigraphic position	Material	Notes	Images
"Psephophorus"	cf. P. terrypratchetti		Telm 4	Platelets, shell fragment	A dermochelyid sea turtle related to modern leatherback turtles.	
Testudines indet.			Cucullaea I Allomember (Telm 5)	Carapace plates	A non-dermochelyid turtle with a bony carapace.	
Crocodilia	Indeterminate		Telm 6/7	Isolated Teeth and mandible	A crocodilian.	

=== Amphibians ===
Taxa	Species	Locality	Stratigraphic position	Material	Notes	Images
Calyptocephalella	C. sp.	Locality IAA 2/95.	Cucullaea I Allomember (Telm 5).	The fragmentary right ilium (NRM-PZ B282) and a skull bone (NRM-PZ B281).	A calyptocephalellid frog	

=== Cartilaginous fish ===
==== Chimaeras ====
Taxa	Species	Locality	Stratigraphic position	Material	Notes	Images
Callorhinchus	C. stahli				A ploughnose chimaera.	
Chimaera	C. seymourensis				A rabbitfish.	
Ischyodus	I. dolloi		Upper	Tooth plates	A relative of ploughnose chimaeras.	

==== Sharks ====
Taxa	Species	Locality	Stratigraphic position	Material	Notes	Images
Abdounia	A. mesetae		Cucullaea I Allomember (Telm 5)		A requiem shark.	
Abdounia	A. richteri		Cucullaea I Allomember (Telm 5)		A requiem shark.	
Anomotodon	A. multidenticulata				An extinct relative of goblin shark.	
Carcharhinus	C. sp.				A requiem shark.	
Centrophorus	C. sp.				A gulper shark.	
Cetorhinus	C. sp.		Middle	Gill raker	A relative of the basking shark.	
Ceolometlaouia	C. pannucae				A carpet shark.	
Dalatias	D. licha				The modern kitefin shark.	
Deania	D. sp.				A longnose dogfish.	
Eodalatias	E. austrinalis				A dalatiid.	
Galeorhinus	G. mesetaensis				A relative of the school shark.	
Galeorhinus	G. sp.		Cucullaea I Allomember (Telm 5), Telm 6		A relative of the school shark.	
Heptranchias	H. howellii			Upper lateral teeth.	A relative of the sevengill shark.	
Hexanchus	H. sp.				A relative of the sixgill shark.	
Kallodentis	K. rhytistemma		Cucullaea I Allomember (Telm 5), Telm 6		A houndshark.	
Lamna	L. cf. nasus				A relative of the porbeagle.	
Macrorhizodus	M. praecursor				A lamnid.	
Meridiogaleus	M. cristatus		Cucullaea I Allomember (Telm 5), Telm 6		A houndshark.	
Mustelus	M. sp.		Cucullaea I Allomember (Telm 5), Telm 6		A smooth-hound.	
Notoramphoscyllium	N. woodwardi				A carpet shark. Initially thought to be teeth of the modern zebra shark.	
Odontaspis	O. winkleri				A relative of the sand shark.	
Otodus	O. auriculatus				A megatooth shark.	
Otodus	O. sokolovi		Upper		A megatooth shark.	
Palaeohypotodus	P. cf. rutoti				A sand shark.	
Paraorthacodus	P. sp.				A paraorthacodontid shark.	
Pristiophorus	P. lanceolatus		Upper		A sawshark.	
Pristiophorus	P. laevis				A sawshark.	
Pseudoginglymostoma	P. cf. P. brevicaudatum				Nomen dubium.	
Scoliodon	S. sp.			Multiple teeth.	A requiem shark.	
Squalus	S. weltoni	UCR RV-8200, Telm 4.	Lower	A complete lateral tooth.	A dogfish.	
Squalus	S. woodburnei	UCR RV-8200, Telm 4.	Lower.	A complete lateral tooth.	A dogfish.	
Squatina	S. sp.		Upper		An angelshark.	
Striatolamia	S. cf. macrota		Upper		A sand shark.	

==== Rays ====
Taxa	Species	Locality	Stratigraphic position	Material	Notes	Images
Marambioraja	M. leiostemma		Lower		A skate.	
Mesetaraja	M. maleficapelli		Lower		A skate.	
Myliobatis	M. sp.				An eagle ray.	
Myliobatoidea indet.				Partial spine	A stingray.	
Pristis	P. sp.				A sawfish.	
Raja	R. amphitrita		Lower		A skate.	
Raja	R. manitaria		Lower		A skate.	

=== Ray-finned fish ===
Taxa	Species	Locality	Stratigraphic position	Material	Notes	Images
Labridae indet.				Large lower pharyngeal tooth plate	A wrasse.	
Macrouridae indet.				Well-preserved skull with otoliths	A grenadier.	
Marambionella	M. andreae			Articulated skeleton	A clupeioid herring relative.	
Mesetaichthys	M. jerzmanskae			Fragmentary skull bones and vertebra.	An early member of the Notothenioidei, the dominant marine fish of Antarctica today. Initially assigned to the hakes.	
Oplegnathus	O. sp.			Jaws with teeth	A knifejaw, earliest record of this family.	
Proeleginops	P. grandeastmanorum			Neurocranium	An early member of the Notothenioidei.	
Siluriformes indet.					A catfish.	
Trichiurus	T. sp.			Teeth	A cutlassfish.	
Xiphiorhynchus	X. cf. sp.				A relative of the swordfish.	

=== Cephalopods ===
Taxa	Species	Locality	Stratigraphic position	Material	Notes	Images
Antarcticeras	A. nordenskjoeldi	NRM 8, below IAA 1/90 (Ungulate Site).	Cucullaea I shell bed, Telm 4.	A fragmentary preserved straight shell.	An enigmatic cephalopod that is either considered a descendant of the orthocerids or an oegopsid squid.	
Euciphoceras	E. sp.	NRM 8, below IAA 1/90 (Ungulate Site).	Cucullaea I shell bed, Telm 4.	A fragmentary preserved straight shell.	A nautiloid.	

=== Plants ===
Taxa	Species	Locality	Stratigraphic position	Material	Notes	Images
Agathoxylon	A. pseudoparenchymatosum	Locality 5	Cucullaea I allomember	Fossilized wood.		Notonuphar
Araucaria	A. marensii					Notonuphar
Cupressinoxylon	C. hallei	Localities 4, 5, 6 and 7.	Campamento and Cucullaea I allomember.	Fossilized wood.		Notonuphar
Notonuphar	N. antarctica	IAA 2/95.	Cucullaea I Allomember (Telm 5).	Fossilized seeds.	A water lily.	Notonuphar
Nelumbo	? Nelumbo sp.					Notonuphar
Protophyllocladoxylon	P. francisiae					Notonuphar
Phyllocladoxylon	P. antarcticum					Notonuphar
Phyllocladoxylon	P. pooleae					Notonuphar

== See also ==
- List of fossiliferous stratigraphic units in Antarctica
