= Sparnotheriodon =

Sparnotheriodon Temporal range: Middle Eocene (Mustersan) ~47.8–41.3 Ma

Scientific classification
- Domain: Eukaryota
- Kingdom: Animalia
- Phylum: Chordata
- Class: Mammalia
- Order: †Litopterna
- Family: †Sparnotheriodontidae
- Genus: †Sparnotheriodon; Soria, 1980
- Species: †S. epsilonoides

Binomial name
- †Sparnotheriodon epsilonoides Soria, 1980

Extinct genus of litopterns

Sparnotheriodon is an extinct genus of sparnotheriodontid litoptern that lived during the Middle Eocene of what is now Argentina, leaving fossils in the Sarmiento Formation.

== Description ==
Sparnotheriodon was a medium-sized litoptern. Sparnotheriodon, Victorlemoinea, and one species of Notiolofos, N. arquinotiensis, have been estimated to have had masses of roughly 400 kg (880 lb), whereas another species of Notiolofos, N. regueroi, was smaller, with a body mass estimated between 25 and 58 kg, making them one of the largest litopterns of the Paleogene. Litopterns reached such sizes again in the Miocene.

== Taxonomy ==
Sparnotheriodon was first named by Miguel Fernando Soria in 1980 on the basis of a mandible and teeth from the Sarmiento Formation of Argentina, with the type species being Sparnotheriodon epsilonoides. In 1983, Richard Cifelli tentatively synonymized Sparnotheriodon with Victorlemoinea, while many other authors consider it distinct.
