= Palaeeudyptes klekowskii =

Palaeeudyptes klekowskii Temporal range: Late Eocene

Scientific classification
- Kingdom: Animalia
- Phylum: Chordata
- Class: Aves
- Order: Sphenisciformes
- Family: Spheniscidae
- Genus: †Palaeeudyptes
- Species: †P. klekowskii

Binomial name
- †Palaeeudyptes klekowskii Myrcha, Tatur & del Valle, 1990

Extinct species of bird

Palaeeudyptes klekowskii is an extinct species of the penguin genus Palaeeudyptes. It was previously thought to have been approximately the size of its congener Palaeeudyptes antarcticus, somewhat larger than the modern emperor penguin, but a 2014 study showed it was in fact almost twice as tall, earning it the nickname "Mega Penguin". Its maximum length is estimated to be up to 2 m (6.6 ft) and maximum body mass up to 116 kg (256 lb). Knowledge of it comes from an extensive collection of fossil bones from the Late Eocene (34-37 MYA) of the La Meseta Formation on Seymour Island, Antarctica. P. klekowskii was at first not recognized as a distinct species, and despite the coexistence of two so closely related species of similar size as Palaeeudyptes gunnari and P. klekowskii seeming somewhat improbable, the amount of fossil material suggests that the two species are indeed diagnosably different.
