= Proectocion =

Proectocion Temporal range: Early Eocene ~42–38 Ma

Scientific classification
- Kingdom: Animalia
- Phylum: Chordata
- Class: Mammalia
- Order: †Litopterna
- Family: †Adianthidae
- Genus: †Proectocion; Ameghino 1904

Type species
- †Proectocion argentinus Ameghino, 1904

Species
- P. argentinus Ameghino 1904; P. precisus Ameghino 1904

Synonyms
- Oxybunotherium Pascual 1965

Extinct genus of litopterns

Proectocion is an extinct genus of adianthid litoptern. It lived during the Early Eocene, in what is now South America.

== Description ==
This genus is mainly known from its fossilized teeth, resembling those of Didolodus. However, the structure of the fourth upper molar of Proectocion was entirely different from those of Didolodontidae; the paracone and the metacone were well separated, and a small mesostyle was present.

The third molard had an hypocone differing from Didolodus, and similar to those of litopterns such as Macrauchenia and Adiantoides. The pattern of the upper molars crown was different from those of Proterotheriidae, but similar to those of Macraucheniidae, with the hypocone joined anteriorly to the crest of the protocone-metacone. The ventrally directed and truncated paralophids as well as the columnar aspect of the cusps of the lower molars, were characteristics also found in the little-known Polymorphis.

The upper molars and premolars had crests interconnecting the cusps, while the third lower molar was elongated and equipped with a well-developed hypoconulid; those features were characteristic of the family Adianthidae.

== Classification ==
Proectocion was first described in 1904 by Florentino Ameghino, based on fossil remains found in Argentine Patagonia. As its name implies, Ameghino considered that Proectocion was ancestral to Ectocion, a North American Phenacodontidae, and ascribed both genera to the family Hyracotheriidae. In 1848, George Gaylord Simpson considered Proectocion as a didolodontid, but latter revisions indicated possible affinities with the family Adianthidae, in the order Litopterna.

Two species have been associated with the genus: Proectocion argentinus and Proectocion precisus, both from Gran Barranca in the Chubut Province. The species Oxybunotherium praecursor, described by Rosendo Pascual in 1965 and found in the localities Laguna de la Bombadilla and Gran Barranca was later attributed to the genus Proectocion.

== Bibliography ==
- G. G. Simpson. 1948. The beginning of the age of mammals in South America. Part I. Bulletin of the American Museum of Natural History 91:1-232
- R. Pascual. 1965. Un nuevo Condylarthra (Mammalia) de edad Casamayorense de Paso de Los Indios (Chubut, Argentina). Breves consideraciones sobre la edad Casamayorense. Ameghiniana 4(2):57-65
- R. L. Cifelli and M. F. Soria. 1983. Systematics of the Adianthidae (Litopterna, Mammalia). American Museum Novitates 2771:1-25
