= Adianthus =

Adianthus Temporal range: Early-Middle Miocene (Colhuehuapian-Friasian) ~20–16 Ma

Scientific classification
- Domain: Eukaryota
- Kingdom: Animalia
- Phylum: Chordata
- Class: Mammalia
- Order: †Litopterna
- Family: †Adianthidae
- Subfamily: †Adianthinae
- Genus: †Adianthus; Ameghino 1891

Type species
- †Adianthus bucatus Ameghino, 1891

Species
- A. bucatus Ameghino 1891; A. godoyi Cifelli 1991

Synonyms
- Adianthus patagonicus Ameghino 1891

Extinct genus of litopterns

Adianthus is an extinct genus of litoptern that lived during the Early Miocene to the Middle Miocene in what is now Argentina and Chile.

== Description ==
This animal is only known from fragmentary remains, mainly from its teeth, and was probably similar to its relative Adiantoides. It was a small animal with generalist teeth, but it had some unusual characteristics. The crown of its teeth was higher than in Adiantoides, and the lower premolars were more molariform. The second lower incisor and the lower canine had three lingually directed ridges, forming two closed basins. The first three premolars had two ridges, while the fourth premolar was completely molariform.

== Classification ==
Adianthus bucatus was first described in 1891 by Florentino Ameghino, based on a single tooth of enigmatic shape, perhaps coming from the so-called "Notohippus beds". Subsequently, Ameghino described a mandible with teeth as a new species, Adianthus patagonicus; however, those remains were later attributed to a different genus, Proheptaconus. In 1991, a new species of Adianthus, A. godoyi, was described by Richard Cifelli from the Galera Formation of Chile, preserving a more complete skeleton, including postcranial remains.

Adianthus is the eponymous genus of the Adianthidae, a family of small-sized litopterns with a characteristic dentition. Adianthus, despite being little known, seems to have been one of the more specialized members of the family.
