= Notonychops =

Notonychops Temporal range: Middle-Late Paleocene ~60–57 Ma

Scientific classification
- Domain: Eukaryota
- Kingdom: Animalia
- Phylum: Chordata
- Class: Mammalia
- Order: †Litopterna
- Family: †Notonychopidae
- Genus: †Notonychops; Soria 1989

Type species
- Notonychops powelli Soria, 1989

Species
- N. poxelli Soria 1989

Extinct genus of mammals

Notonychops is an extinct genus of mammal, belonging to the order Litopterna, that lived during the Middle to Late Paleocene in what is today South America.

== Description ==
This genus is only known from a fragmentary mandible and maxilla, and it is therefore difficult to hypothesize on its general appearance. Notonychops had a specialized set of teeth, with selenodont lower molars and premolars with a strong parastyle and a metastyle with paracone and protocone, and the first premolar was absent. The molars had a strong parastyle, and were similar to those of primitive tillodonts, such as Esthonyx, and of little known litopterns such as Indalecia.

== Classification ==
Notonychops powelli was first described by Miguel Soria in 1989, based on fossilized remains found in the lower member of the Rio Loro Formation in Argentina. According to Soria, Notonychops was a representative of a radiation of primitive South American ungulates, Notopterna, distinct from both Litopterna and Notoungulata. Ascribed to a separate family, the Notonychopidae, Notonychops was thought to be related to other basal South American ungulates, such as Amilnedwardsia and Indalecia. However, modern authors places Notonychops and its relative Requisia within Litopterna, albeit in a family of their own.

== Bibliography ==
- M. F. Soria. 1989. Notopterna: un nuevo orden de mamíferos ungulados eógenos de América del Sur. II: Notonychops powelli gen. et sp. nov (Notonychopidae nov.) de la Formación Río Loro (Paleoceno medio), provincia de Tucumán, Argentina. Ameghiniana 25(3):259-272
- J. F. Bonaparte and J. Morales. 1997. Un primitivo Notonychopidae (Litopterna) del Paleoceno inferior de Punta Peligro, Chubut, Argentina. Estudios Geológicos 53(5-6):263-274
