= Palaeeudyptes marplesi =

Palaeeudyptes marplesi Temporal range: Middle Eocene–Late Eocene

Scientific classification
- Kingdom: Animalia
- Phylum: Chordata
- Class: Aves
- Order: Sphenisciformes
- Family: Spheniscidae
- Genus: †Palaeeudyptes
- Species: †P. marplesi

Binomial name
- †Palaeeudyptes marplesi Brodkorb, 1963

Extinct species of bird

Marples' penguin (Palaeeudyptes marplesi) was a large species of the extinct penguin genus Palaeeudyptes.

It stood between 105 and 145 centimetres (3 ft 5 in and 4 ft 9 in) high in life, larger than the present emperor penguin. The precise relationship between this species and the slightly smaller narrow-flippered penguin (Palaeeudyptes antarcticus) from somewhat younger rocks is not resolved; possibly, P. marplesi is a synonym or subspecies of P. antarcticus.

This species is known from a partial skeleton, mainly leg bones (Otago Museum C.50.25 to C.50.45), recovered from Middle or Late Eocene Burnside Mudstone rocks (34-40 MYA) at Burnside, Dunedin, in New Zealand.

Many other bones are often assigned to this species. However, as most of them are only roughly dated and intermediate in size between this species and P. antarcticus, they should not be referred to either taxon pending a comprehensive review of the New Zealand material of Palaeeudyptes (which will probably result in recognizing that P. marplesi was a larger progenitor species or subspecies of P. antarcticus).

The binomen of this species honors Brian J. Marples, one of the foremost researchers of fossil penguins in the 20th century.
