= Acta Palaeontologica Polonica =

Peer-reviewed scientific journal

- Discipline: Paleontology, paleobiology
- Language: English
- Edited by: Richard L. Cifelli, Jarosław Stolarski

Publication details
- History: 1956–present
- Publisher: Institute of Paleobiology, Polish Academy of Sciences (Poland)
- Frequency: Quarterly
- Open access: Yes
- License: Creative Commons Attribution License
- Impact factor: 1.949 (2010)

Standard abbreviations
- ISO 4: Acta Palaeontol. Pol.

Indexing
- CODEN: APGPAC
- ISSN: 0567-7920 (print); 1732-2421 (web)
- LCCN: 60040714
- OCLC no.: 02051833

Links
- Journal homepage; Online access; Online archives

Acta Palaeontologica Polonica is a quarterly peer-reviewed open access scientific journal of paleontology and paleobiology. It was established by Roman Kozłowski in 1956. It is published by the Institute of Paleobiology of the Polish Academy of Sciences and edited by Richard L. Cifelli and Jarosław Stolarski.

== Abstracting and indexing ==
Acta Palaeontologica Polonica is abstracted and indexed in:

- Biological Abstracts
- Current Contents/Physical, Chemical and Earth Sciences
- GeoArchive
- Geological Abstracts
- GeoRef
- PASCAL
- Petroleum Abstracts
- Polish Scientific Journals Contents
- Referativny Zhurnal
- Research Alert
- Science Citation Index Expanded
- The Zoological Record

According to the Journal Citation Reports, the journal has a 2010 impact factor of 1.949, ranking it 11th out of 48 journals in the category "Paleontology".
