= Proacrodon =

Scientific classification
- Kingdom: Animalia
- Phylum: Chordata
- Class: Mammalia
- Order: ?Litopterna
- Genus: Proacrodon Roth, 1899

Type species
- Proacrodon transformatus Roth, 1899

Dubious genus of extinct mammal

Proacrodon is a dubious genus of extinct mammal from South America. Its type species is Proacrodon transformatus. The only known specimen, a lower premolar or molar, is now lost, and its affinities are unknown.

In 1899, Santiago Roth named the new genus and species Proacrodon transformatus on the basis of a single tooth collected in Patagonia. The genus name comes from Greek πρό "before", άκρος "pointed", and όδών "tooth", and refers to the shape of the tooth, which rises higher in its anterior portion than its posterior portion. Roth compared the taxon to Megacrodon, which he named in the same paper, and to Hyrachyus. Florentino Ameghino synonymized Proacrodon with his own genus Trimerostephanus without seeing the specimen firsthand. In 1904, Palmer listed both Proacrodon and Trimerostephanos as members of Isotemnidae. In 1948 George Gaylord Simpson listed the taxon as a possible litoptern and concluded that the taxon was a nomen vanum, viewing Ameghino's proposal of synonymy with Trimerostephanos as possible but not reliable.

The locality where the tooth was collected is not known with certainty, but was probably in the Musters Formation.
