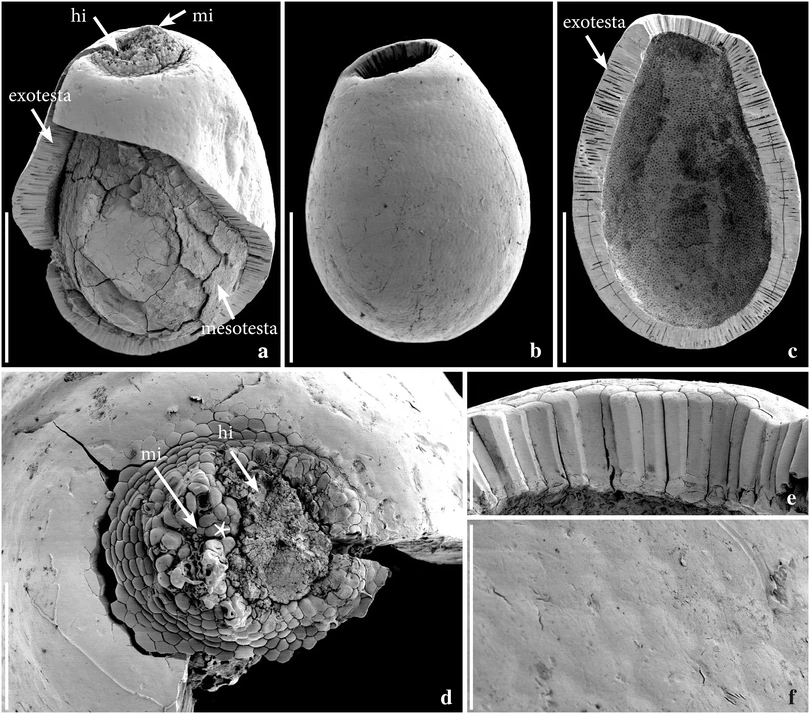
- Fossil seeds

Scientific classification
- Kingdom: Plantae
- Clade: Embryophytes
- Clade: Tracheophytes
- Clade: Angiosperms
- Order: Nymphaeales
- Family: Nymphaeaceae
- Genus: †Notonuphar; Friis, Iglesias, Reguero & Mörs, 2017
- Species: †N. antarctica

Binomial name
- †Notonuphar antarctica Friis, Iglesias, Reguero & Mörs, 2017

= Notonuphar =

Notonuphar Temporal range: Early to Middle Eocene ~51 Ma

Extinct genus of plants

Notonuphar is an extinct genus of water lily in the family Nymphaeaceae. It contains a single species, Notonuphar antarctica. It is only known only from the Eocene-aged La Meseta Formation of Seymour Island, Antarctica.

== Taxonomy ==
It is notable for being the first water lily known to have inhabited Antarctica. It is known from numerous fossil seeds which are abundant throughout certain horizons of the La Meseta Formation, constituting over 95% of fossil seeds in some areas. The anatomy of these seeds supports a close relationship with the genus Nuphar, a genus presently restricted to the Northern Hemisphere. Morphological analysis also recovers it as being the sister genus of Nuphar. It is the first Gondwanan plant known to be related to Nuphar.

The genus name Notonuphar is derived from the Greek word "notos" (meaning "south") and Nuphar, literally translating to "southern Nuphar." The specific epithet antarctica refers to the species being discovered on the continent of Antarctica.

== Paleobiology ==
During the Eocene, Antarctica was not yet glaciated and had a climate and ecosystem similar to the modern Valdivian temperate rain forest of Chile. Notonuphar is the first discovered Antarctic fossil species known to have inhabited freshwater habitats. It was likely a common plant of freshwater wetlands near the coast, where rivers may have washed the seeds of Notonuphar out to sea, where they later fossilized. Notonuphar likely shared its freshwater habitat with an undescribed aquatic plant possibly related to Nelumbo (the extant lotus genus), as well as a large frog of the genus Calyptocephalella (which was found at the same type locality).

== See also ==
- Antarctic flora
