= Requisia =

Requisia Temporal range: Early Paleocene ~62.5–59 Ma

Scientific classification
- Domain: Eukaryota
- Kingdom: Animalia
- Phylum: Chordata
- Class: Mammalia
- Order: †Litopterna
- Family: †Notonychopidae
- Genus: †Requisia; Bonaparte & Morales 1997

Type species
- Requisia vidmari Bonaparte & Morales, 1997

Species
- R. vidmari Bonaparte & Morales 1997

Extinct genus of litopterns

Requisia is an extinct genus of litoptern from the Early Paleocene of Argentina. Its fossilized remains were found in the Salamanca Formation in the Chubut Province. It is a monotypic genus, its only known species being Requisia vidmari.

== Description ==
It had a dental morphology quite similar to Notonychops, but with more basal characters. The cuspid morphology, the type of wear and the crescent-shaped characters of the third upper molar indicates that Requisia vidmari had strong signs of solenodont characters, and is therefore considered as one of the basal representatives of the order Litopterna. Requisia is more basal than Notonychops, but their morphological similarities could justify to include them in the same family, Notonychopidae, potentially alongside Wainka. It is supposed that the adaptive radiation of South American ungulates during the Paleocene was a fast phenomenon, which makes it difficult to find a satisfying phylogenetic model.
