= Palaeeudyptes gunnari =

Palaeeudyptes gunnari Temporal range: Middle Eocene–Late Eocene

Scientific classification
- Domain: Eukaryota
- Kingdom: Animalia
- Phylum: Chordata
- Class: Aves
- Order: Sphenisciformes
- Family: Spheniscidae
- Genus: †Palaeeudyptes
- Species: †P. gunnari

Binomial name
- †Palaeeudyptes gunnari (Wiman, 1905)

Synonyms
- Eosphaeniscus gunnari Wiman, 1905

Extinct species of bird

Palaeeudyptes gunnari is an extinct species of the extinct penguin genus Palaeeudyptes. It was a bit smaller than its congener Palaeeudyptes antarcticus of New Zealand, standing between 110 and 125 cm high, approximately the size of the emperor penguin. It is known from dozens of fossil bones from Middle or Late Eocene strata (34-50 MYA) of the La Meseta Formation on Seymour Island, Antarctica. Initially, it was described as a separate genus, Eosphaeniscus. However, this was based on a single weathered and broken tarsometatarsus. Better material recovered later showed that the species belongs into the present genus.

Wimanornis is probably a synonym of this species (Jadwiszcak, 2006).
