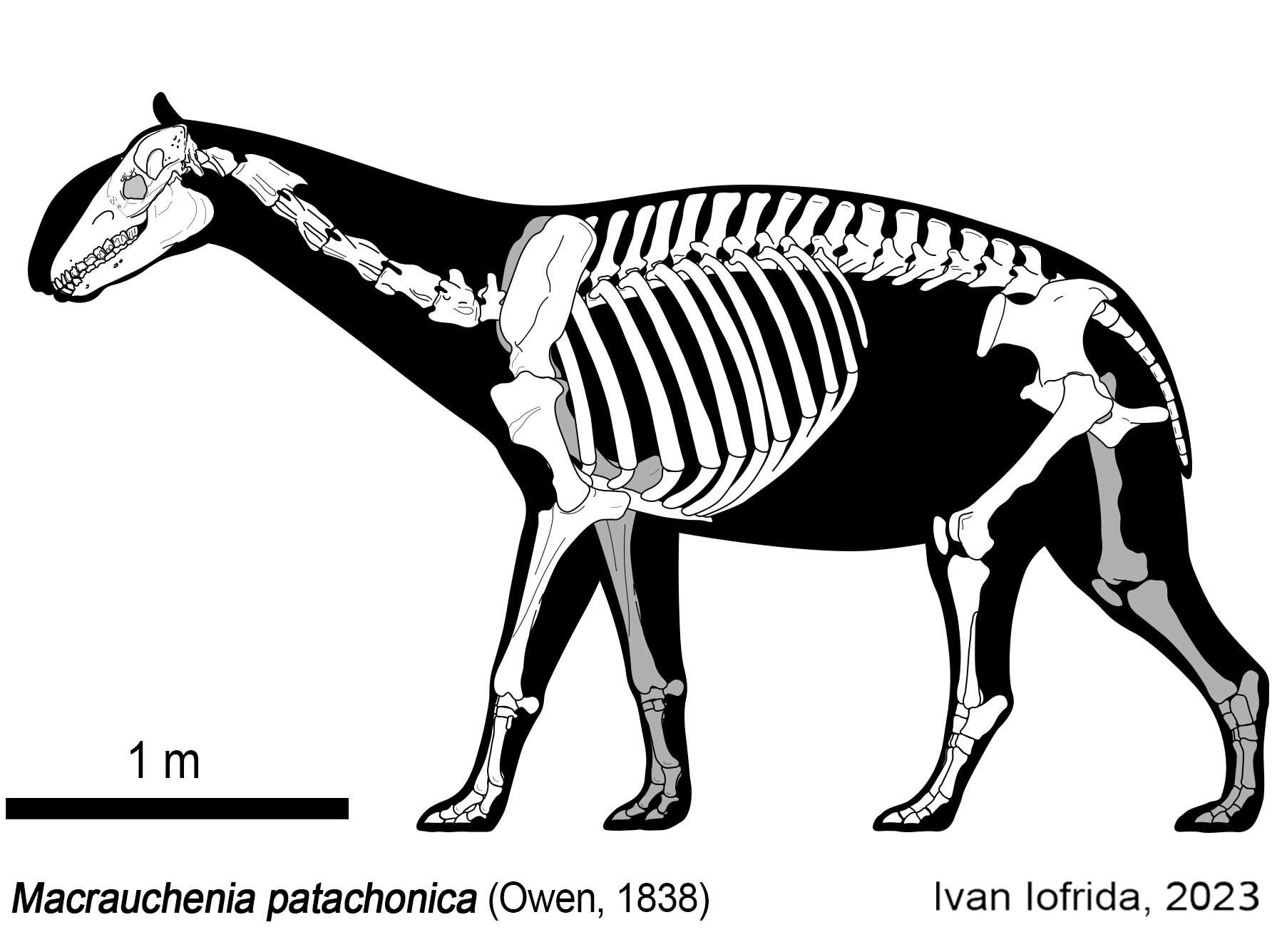
- Skeleton of Macrauchenia (Macraucheniidae)
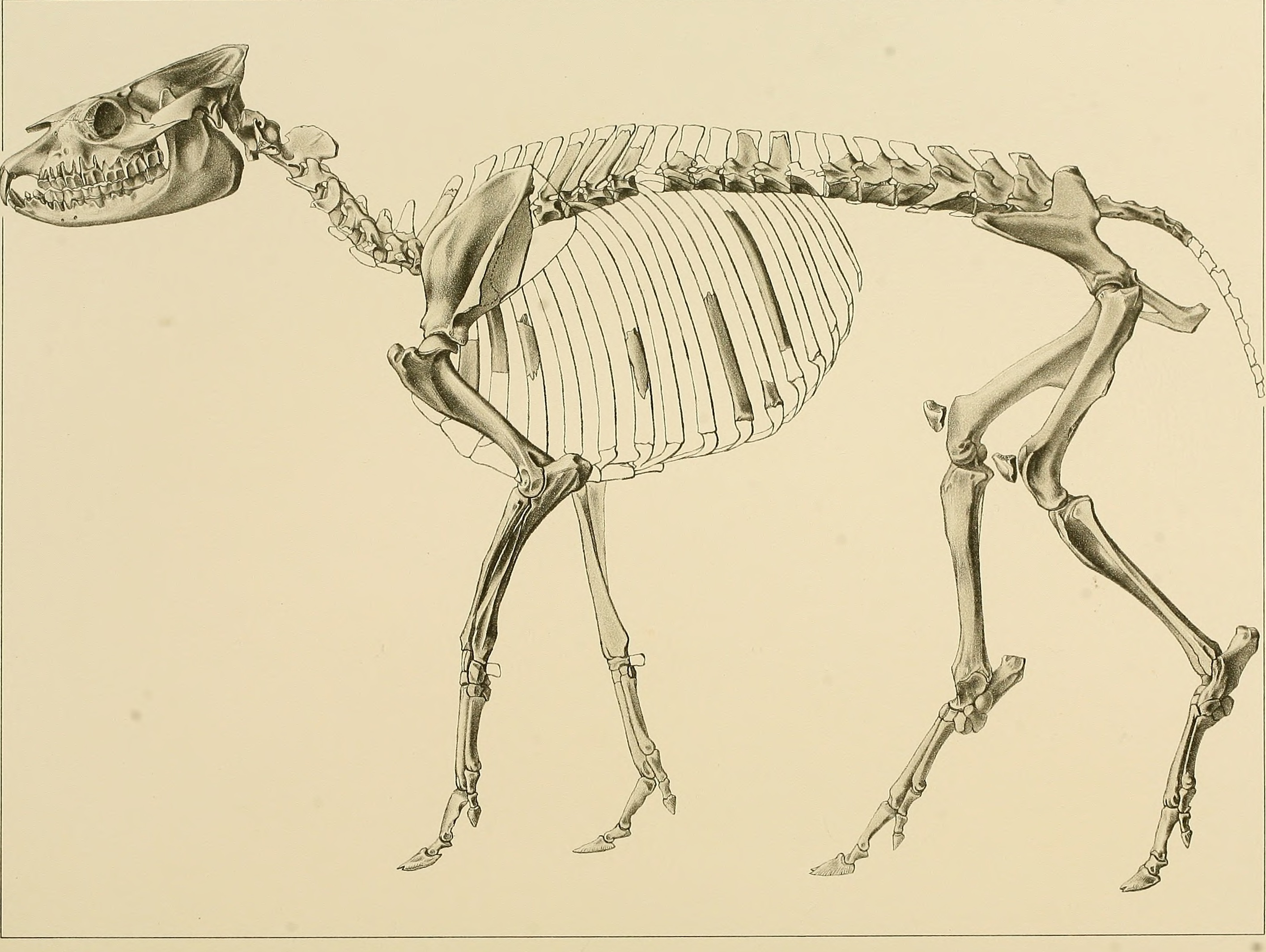
- Skeleton of Diadiaphorus (Proterotheriidae)

Scientific classification
- Kingdom: Animalia
- Phylum: Chordata
- Class: Mammalia
- Clade: Panperissodactyla
- Order: †Litopterna; Ameghino 1889

Subgroups
- †Didolodontidae?; †Notonychopidae; †Protolipternidae; †Sparnotheriodontidae; †Indaleciidae; †Lopholipterna; †Proterotherioidea; †Proterotheriidae; †Macrauchenioidea; †Adianthidae; †Macraucheniidae

= Litopterna =

Litopterna Temporal range: Paleocene–Holocene

Extinct order of hoofed mammals

Litopterna (from Ancient Greek: λῑτή πτέρνα "smooth heel") is an extinct order of South American native ungulates that lived from the Paleocene to the Pleistocene-Holocene around 62.5 million to 12,000 years ago (or possibly as late as 3,500 years ago), and were also present in West Antarctica during the Eocene. They represent the second most diverse group of South American ungulates after Notoungulata. It is divided into nine families, with Proterotheriidae and Macraucheniidae being the most diverse and last surviving families.

== Diversity ==
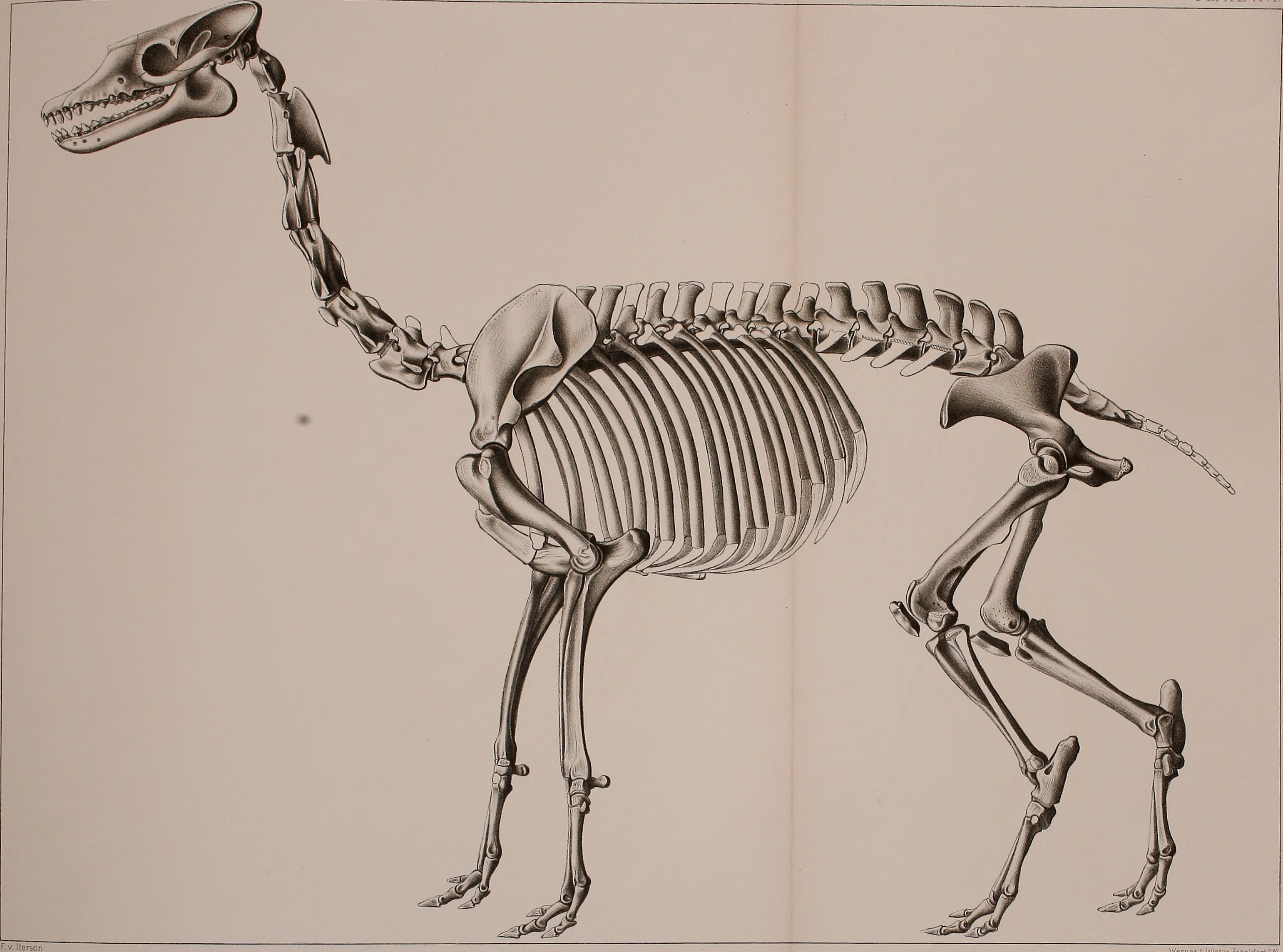
Skeleton of Theosodon (Macraucheniidae)

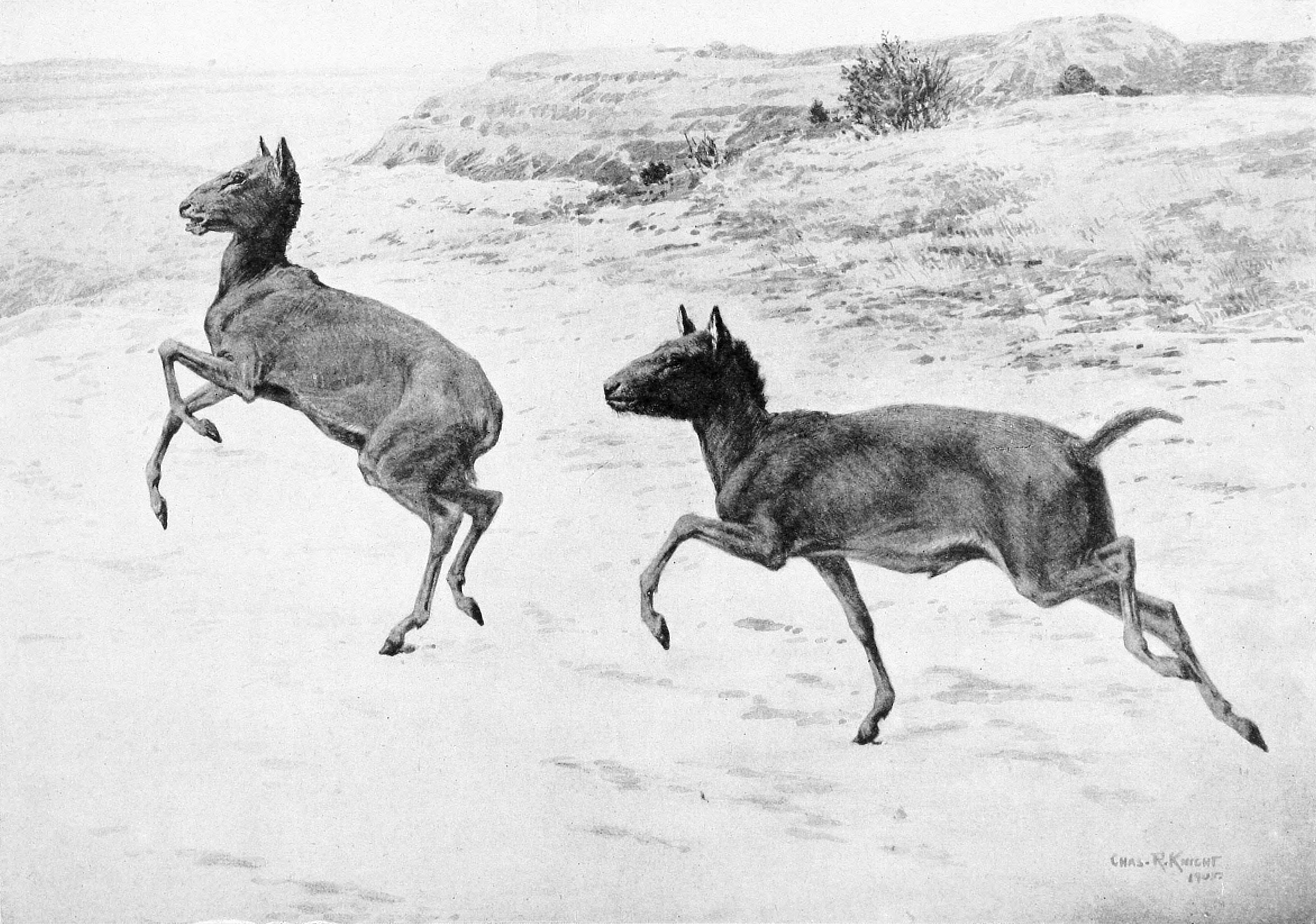
Historic life restoration of Thoatherium (Proterotheriidae)

The body forms of many litopterns, notably in the limb and skull structure, are broadly similar to those of living ungulates, unlike other South American native ungulate groups, which are often strongly divergent from living ungulates. Paleocene and Eocene litopterns generally had small body masses, with Protolipterna (Protolipternidae) estimated to have had a body mass of 0.5–1.5 kilograms (1.1–3.3 lb), though the Eocene sparnotheriodontids were considerably larger, with estimated body masses of around 400 kilograms (880 lb). Most proterotheriids had body masses of around 15 to 80 kilograms (33 to 176 lb) while many macraucheniids had body masses of around 80–120 kilograms (180–260 lb). Some of the last macraucheniids like Macrauchenia were considerably larger, with body masses around a ton. Adianthidae generally had small body masses, with members of the genus Adianthus estimated to weigh 7.4–20 kilograms (16–44 lb). Members of the proterotheriid subfamily Megadolodinae are noted for having bunodont (rounded cusp) molar teeth, which is largely unique to litopterns among South American native ungulates. Litopterns of the mid-late Cenozoic had hinge-like limb joints and hooves similar to those of modern ungulates, with the weight being supported on three toes in macraucheniids and one in proterotheriids, with the protherotheriid Thoatherium developing greater toe reduction than that present in living horses. Macraucheniids had long necks and limbs.

Members of the macraucheniid subfamily Macraucheniinae saw the progressive migration of the nasal opening to the top of the skull, which was often historically suggested to indicate the presence of a trunk, though other authors have suggested that a moose-like prehensile lip, or a saiga-like nose to filter dust are more likely.

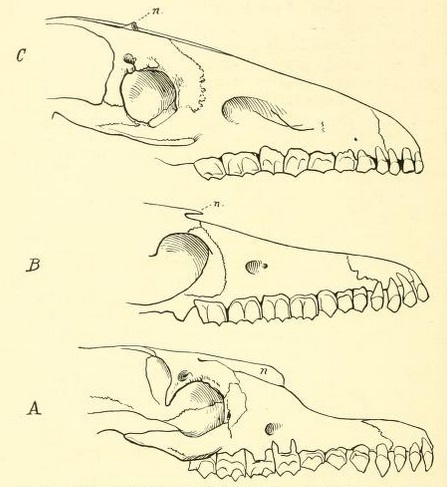
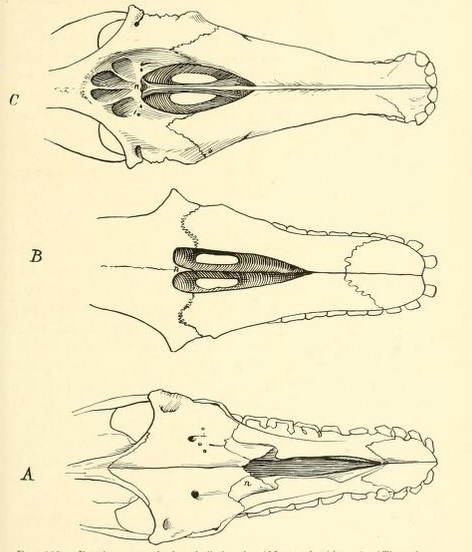
Skulls of the macraucheniids (A) Theosodon, (B) Scalabrinitherium, (C) Macrauchenia, portraying how the nasal bones shifted backwards on the skull, with the nasal opening following suit.

== Ecology ==
Litopterns were likely hindgut fermenters. At least some macraucheniids like Macrauchenia are suggested to have been mixed feeders feeding on both browse and grass. Sparnotheriodontids are suggested to have been browsers. Some proterotheriids are suggested to have been browsers, while some members proterotheriid subfamily Megadolodinae like Megadolodus have been suggested to have been omnivorous with at least part of their diet consisting of hard fruit.

== Evolutionary history ==
Litopterna, like other "South American native ungulates" is thought to have originated from groups of archaic "condylarths" that migrated from North America. Sequencing of the collagen proteome and mitochondrial genome of Macrauchenia has revealed that litopterns are true ungulates, sharing a common ancestor with Notoungulata, and with their closest living relatives being Perissodactyla (the group containing living equines, rhinoceros and tapirs) as part of the clade Panperissodactyla, with the split from Perissodactyla being estimated at around 66 million years ago. The relationship of Litopterna to other South American native ungulate groups is uncertain, though it may be closely related to the "condylarth" group Didolodontidae. The earliest litopterns appeared during the early Paleocene, around 62.5 million years ago.

Aside from South America, sparnotheriodontids are also known from the Eocene aged La Meseta Formation in the Antarctic Peninsula, representing the only record of litopterns on the Antarctic continent. Litopterns declined during the Pliocene and Pleistocene, likely as a result of climatic change and competition with recently immigrated North American ungulates who arrived as part of the Great American interchange, following the connection of the previously isolated North and South America via the Isthmus of Panama. Macrauchenia, Xenorhinotherium (Macraucheniidae) and Neolicaphrium (Proterotheriidae) were the last surviving genera of litopterns. All became extinct at the end of the Late Pleistocene around 12,000 years ago as part of the end-Pleistocene extinction event, along with most other large mammals in the Americas, co-inciding with the arrival of the first humans to the continent. A study in 2025 suggested that Xenorhinotherium may have survived until the late Holocene based on a specimen radiocarbon dated to 3,493–4,217 years cal. Before Present (BP). It is possible that hunting had a causal role in their extinction.

== Classification ==
- Order Litopterna
  - Proacrodon
  - Family Protolipternidae
    - Asmithwoodwardia
    - Miguelsoria
    - Protolipterna
  - Family Indaleciidae
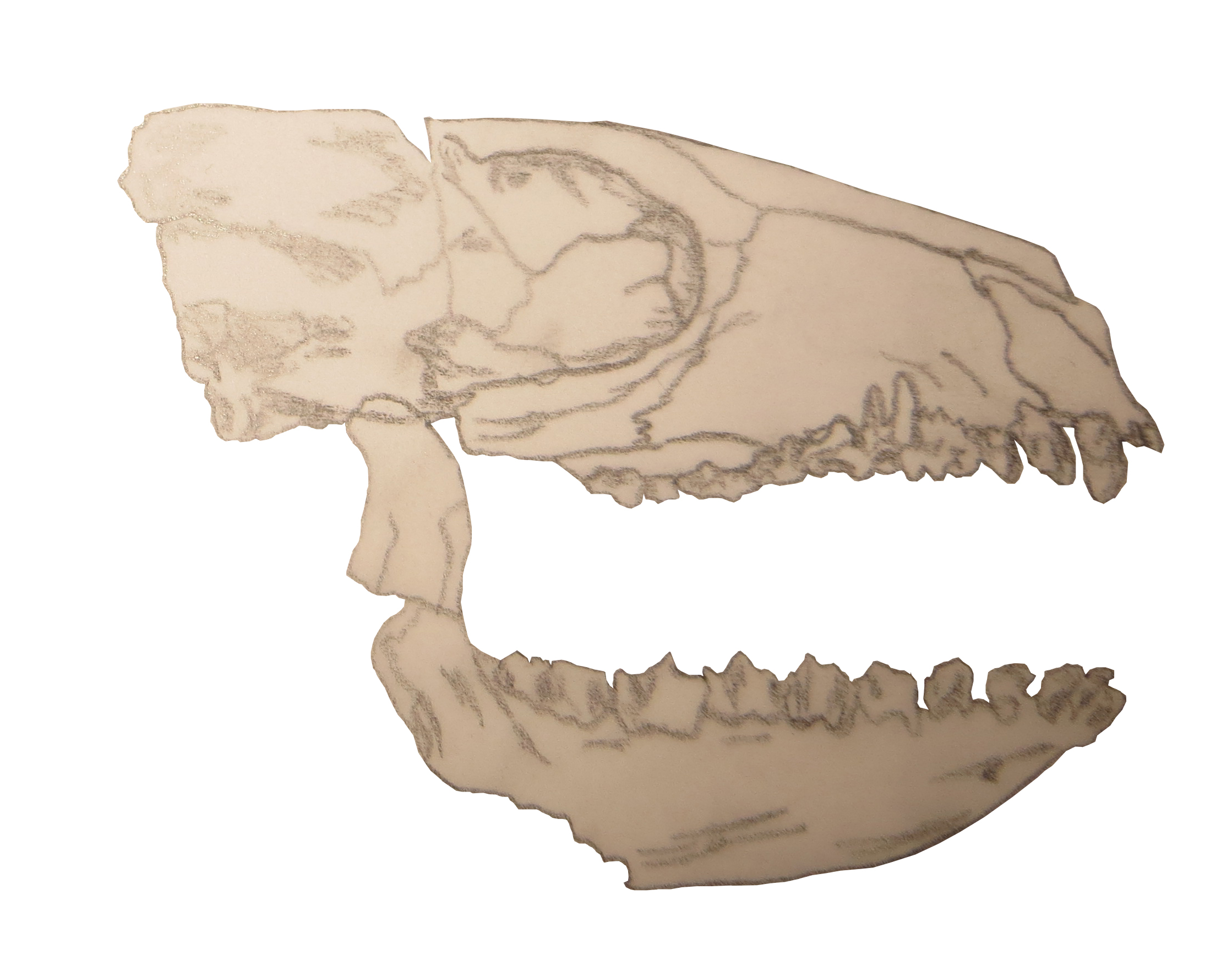
    - Adiantoides leali
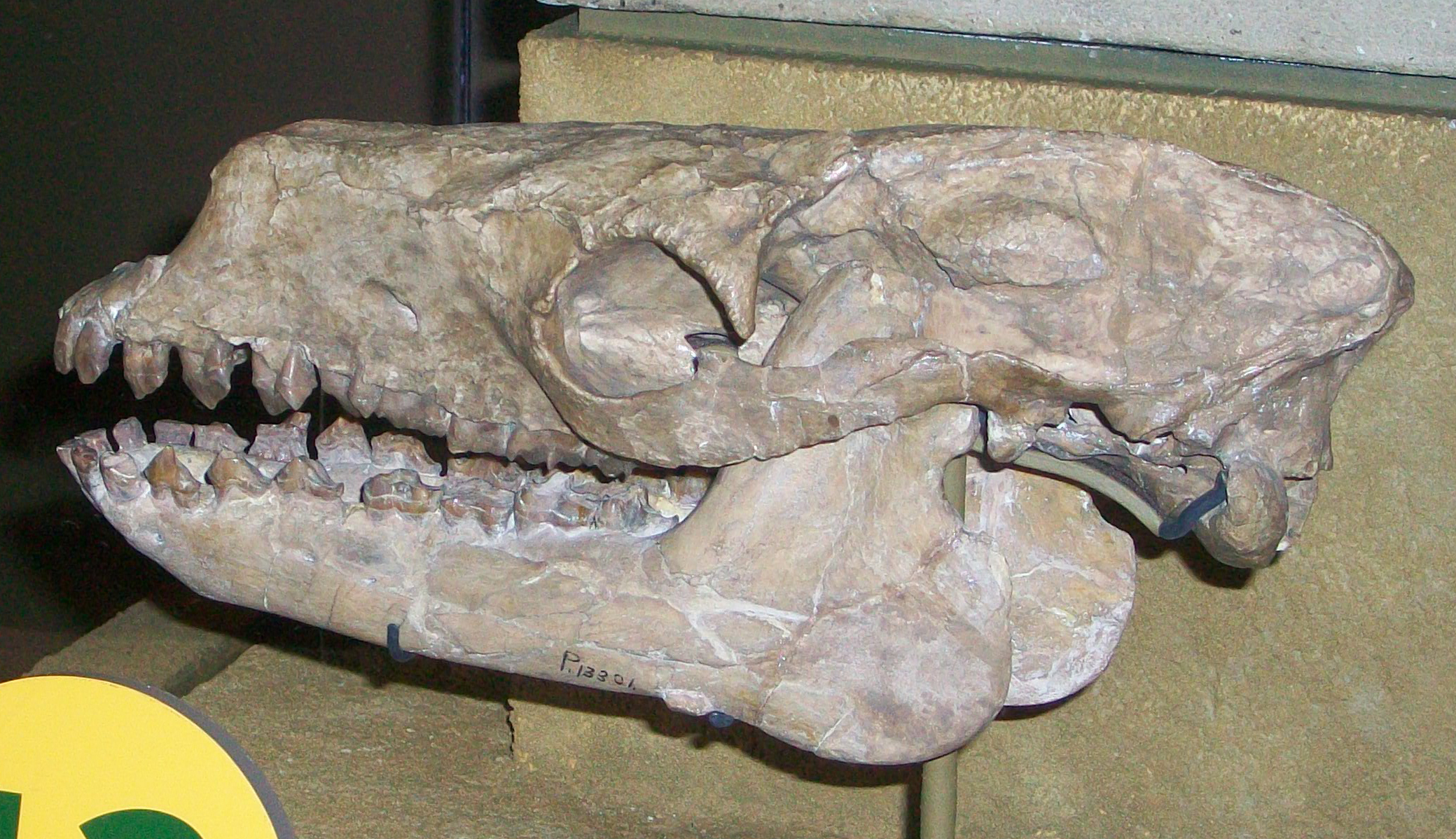
      Cramauchenia normalis
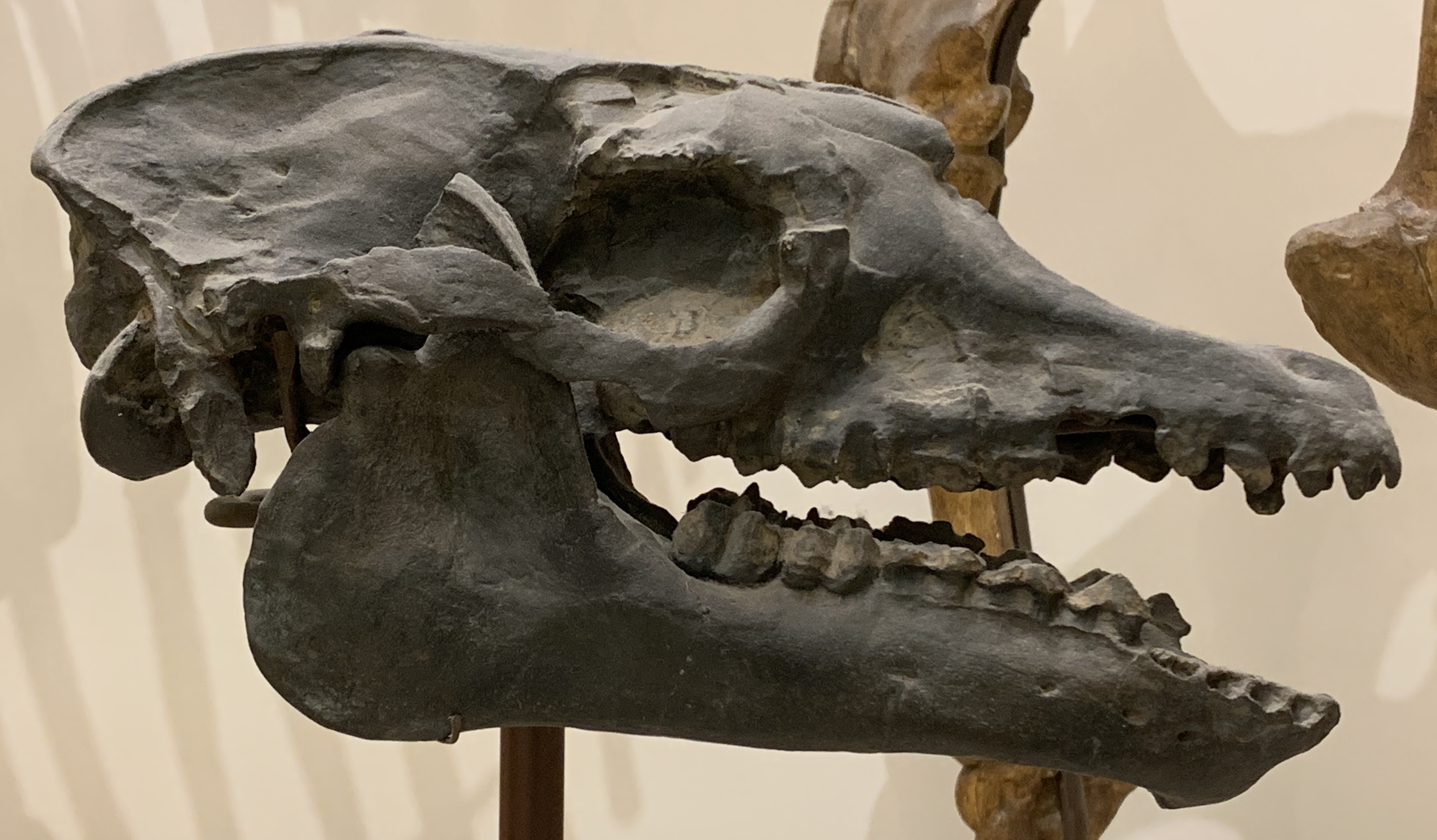
      Theosodon patagonica
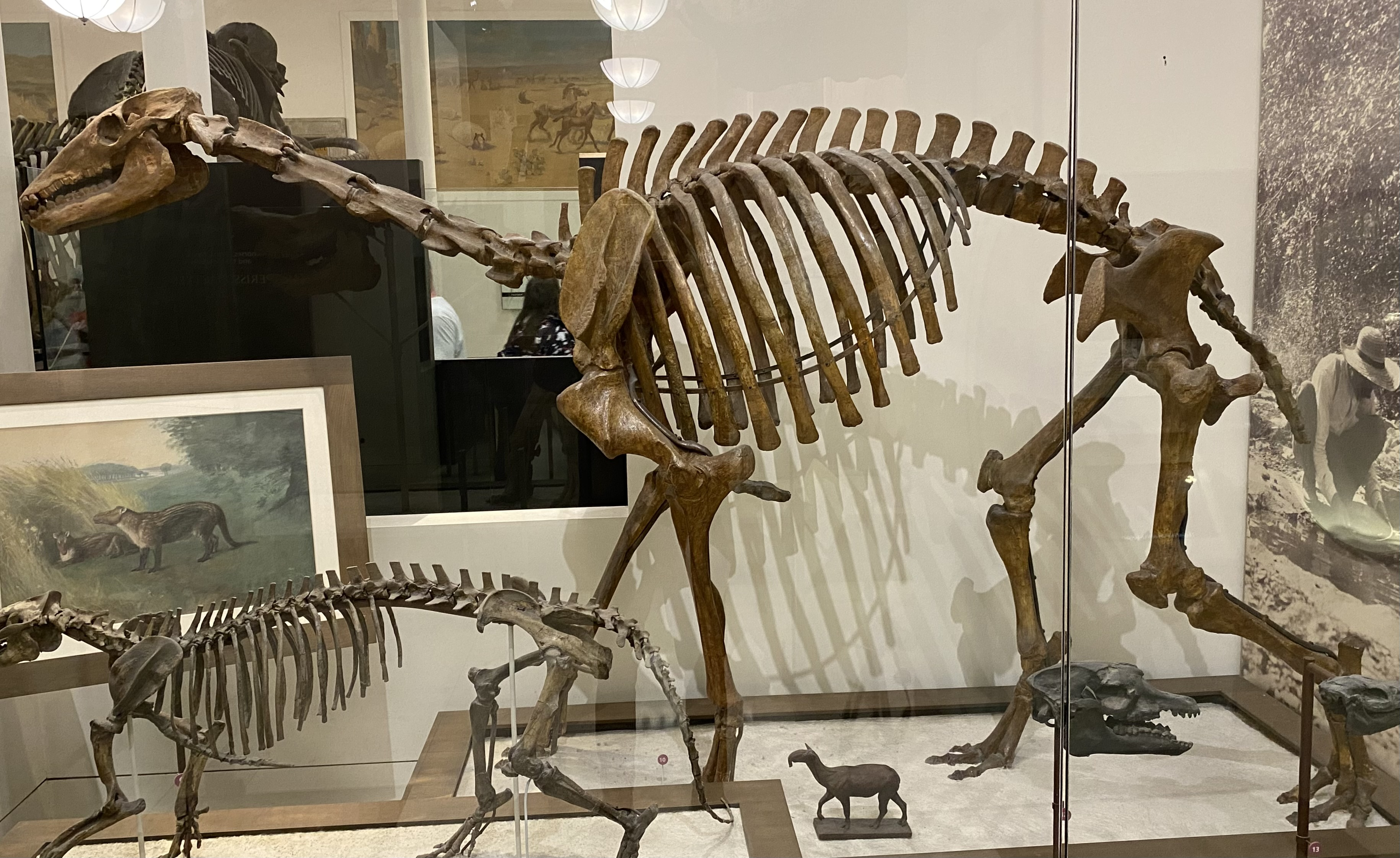
      Macrauchenia
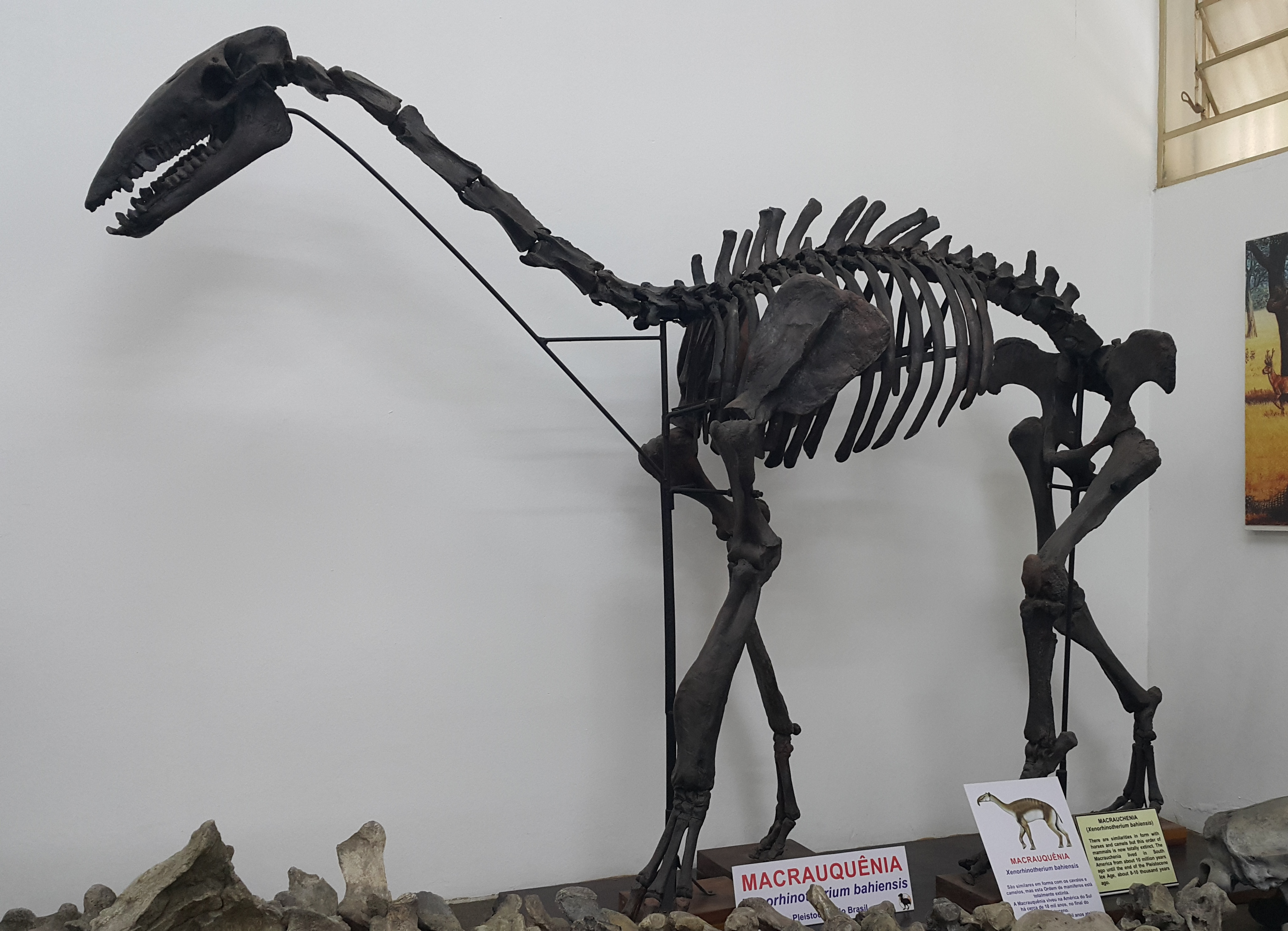
      Xenorhinotherium bahiensis
      Adiantoides
    - Indalecia
  - Family Sparnotheriodontidae
    - Phoradiadius
    - Notiolofos
    - Sparnotheriodon
    - Victorlemoinea
  - Family Amilnedwardsiidae
    - Amilnedwardsia
    - Ernestohaeckelia
    - Rutimeyeria
  - Family Notonychopidae
    - Notonychops
    - Requisia
  - Superfamily Macrauchenioidea
    - Family Adianthidae
      - Proectocion
      - Adianthinae
        - Adianthus
        - Proadiantus
        - Proheptaconus
        - Thadanius
        - Tricoelodus
    - Family Macraucheniidae
      - Llullataruca
      - Subfamily Cramaucheniinae
        - Coniopternium
        - Caliphrium
        - Cramauchenia
        - Phoenixauchenia
        - Polymorphis
        - Pternoconius
        - Theosodon
      - Subfamily Macraucheniinae
        - Cullinia
        - Huayqueriana
        - Macrauchenia
        - Macraucheniopsis
        - Oxyodontherium
        - Paranauchenia
        - Promacrauchenia
        - Scalabrinitherium
        - Windhausenia
        - Xenorhinotherium
  - Superfamily Proterotherioidea
    - Family Proterotheriidae
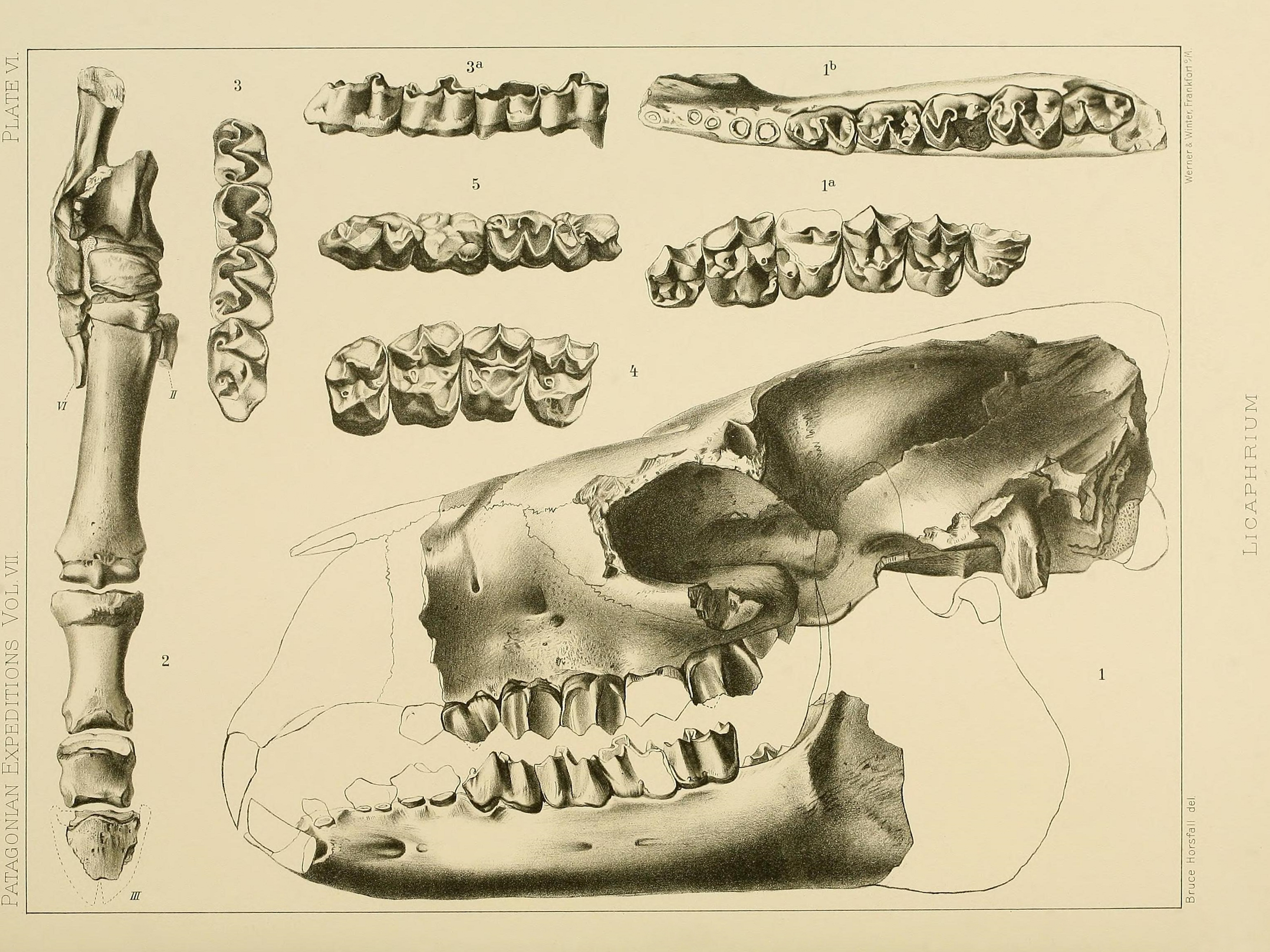
      - Anisolophus floweri
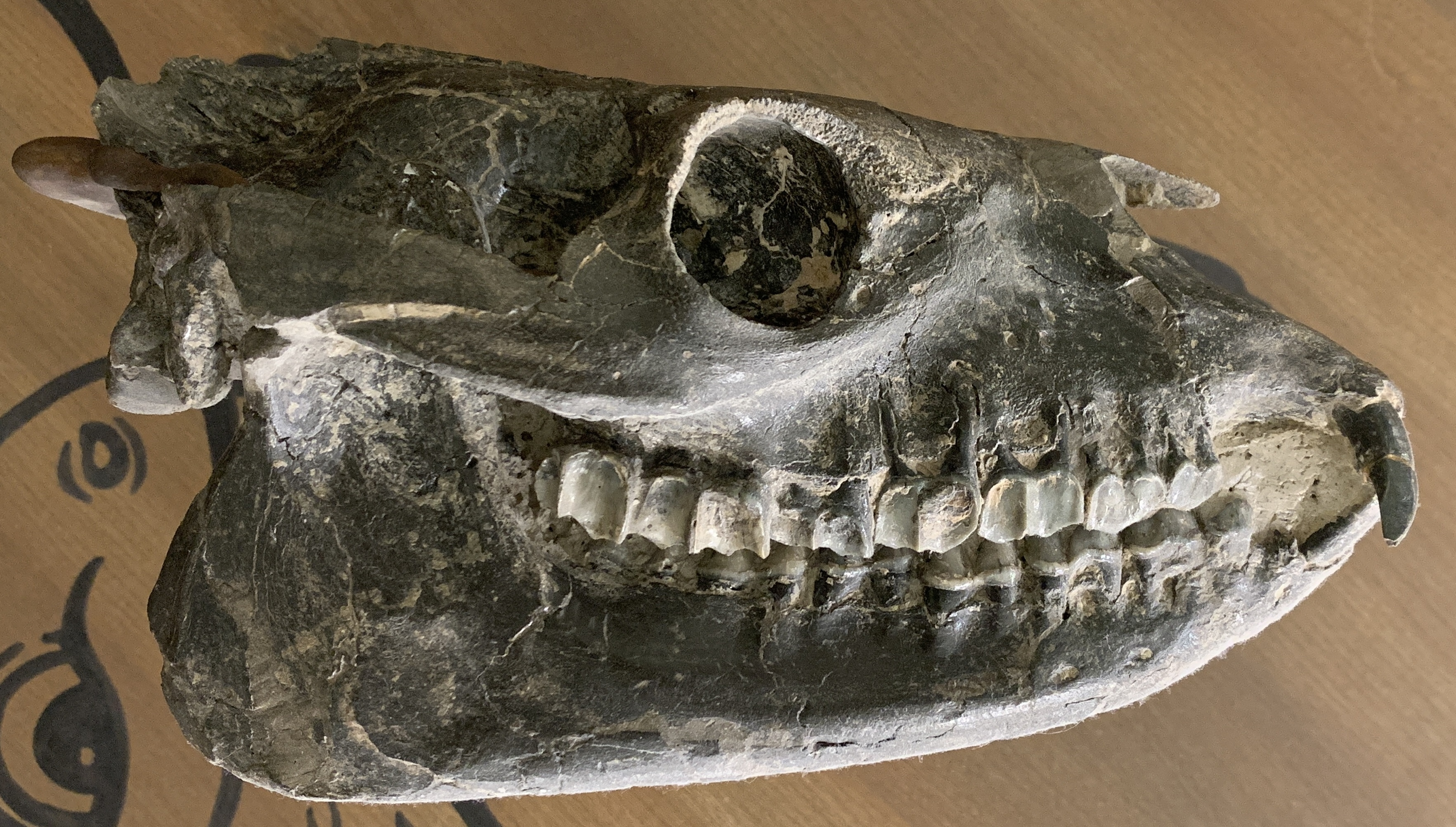
        Diadiaphorus majusculus
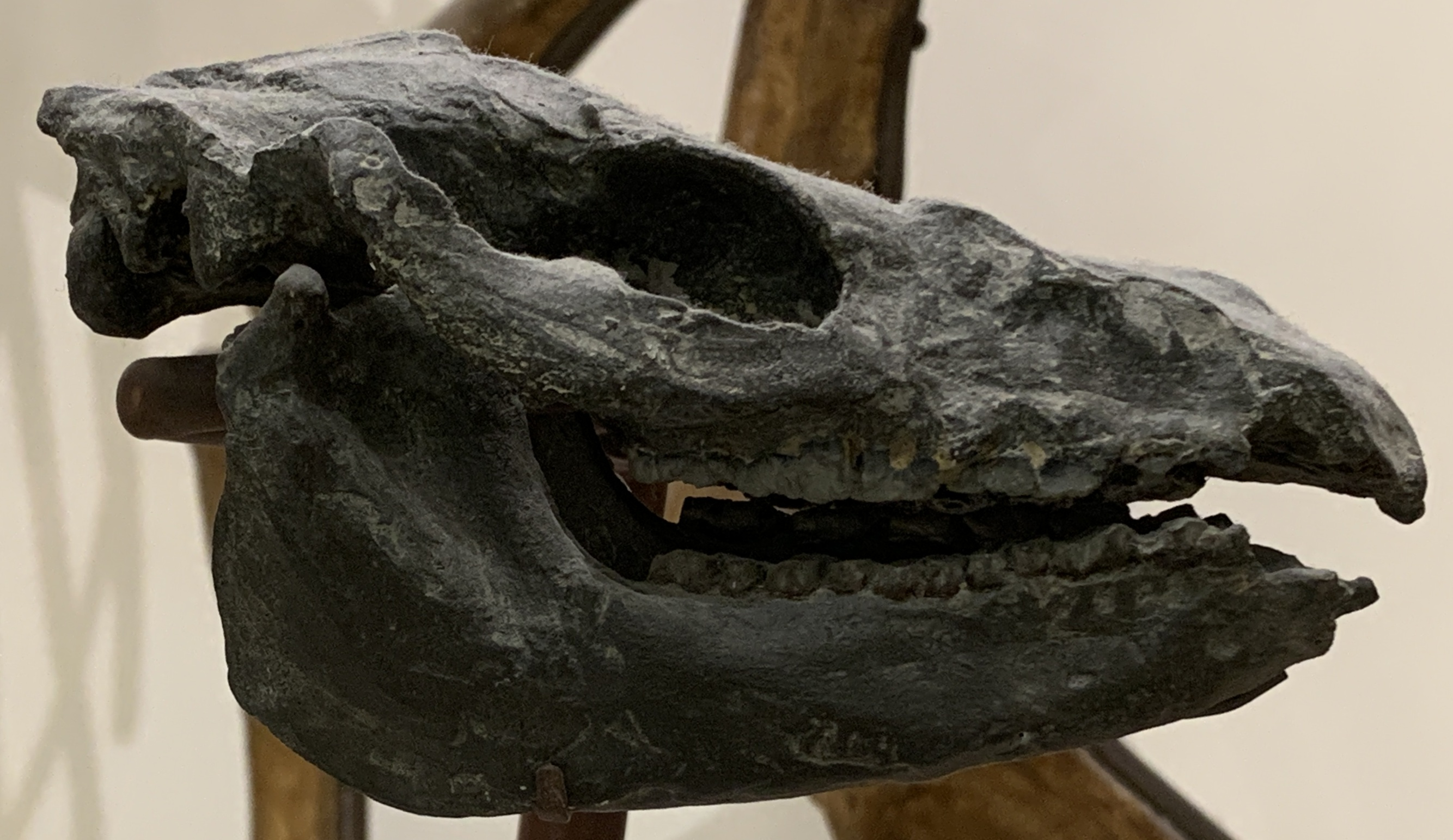
        Thoatherium crepidatum
        Anisolambda
      - Anisolophus
      - Brachytherium
      - Diadiaphorus
      - Diplasiotherium
      - Eoauchenia
      - Eolicaphrium
      - Epecuenia
      - Epitherium
      - Guilielmofloweria
      - Heteroglyphis
      - Lambdaconus
      - Lambdaconops
      - Mesolicaphrium
      - Neobrachytherium
      - Neodolodus
      - Neolicaphrium
      - Olisanophus
      - Paramacrauchenia
      - Paranisolambda
      - Picturotherium
      - Prolicaphrium
      - Promylophis
      - Proterotherium
      - Protheosodon
      - Pseudobrachytherium
      - Tetramerorhinus
      - Thoatherium
      - Thoatheriopsis
      - Villarroelia
      - Uruguayodon
      - Wainka
      - Xesmodon
      - Megadolodinae
        - Bounodus
        - Megadolodus
