= Sparnotheriodontidae =

Sparnotheriodontidae Temporal range: Late Paleocene-Late Eocene (Itaboraian-Divisaderan) ~53–37.2 Ma

Scientific classification
- Kingdom: Animalia
- Phylum: Chordata
- Class: Mammalia
- Infraclass: Placentalia
- Order: †Litopterna
- Family: †Sparnotheriodontidae; Soria, 1980

Genera
- †Notiolofos; †Phoradiadus; †Sparnotheriodon; †Victorlemoinea

Extinct family of litopterns

Sparnotheriodontidae is an enigmatic extinct family of litopterns known primarily from teeth. Sparnotheriodontids are one of two South American native ungulate clades known to have reached Antarctica, the other being astrapotheres.

== Description ==
Sparnotheriodontids ranged in size from the mid-sized Phoradiadus to the large Sparnotheriodon. Sparnotheriodon and one species of Notiolofos, N. arquinotiensis, have been estimated to have had masses of roughly 400 kg (880 lb). Another species of Notiolofos, N. regueroi, was smaller, with a body mass estimated to have been between 25 and 58 kg.

== Classification ==
The phylogenetic position of Sparnotheriodontidae is uncertain. Most researchers consider them to belong to Litopterna. In contrast, Cifelli and Bergqvist have argued that sparnotheriodontids are condylarths. Their methodology, based on attempting to associate isolated teeth and isolated postcranial bones based on size and relative abundance, has been criticized. Phylogenetic analyses conducted by Chimento and Agnolin in 2020 and Kramarz et al. 2021 both included one sparnotheriodontid, Victorlemoinea, and found it to be a basal litoptern. Unlike most authors, who treat sparnotheriodontids as a family, in 1997 McKenna and Bell classified them as a subfamily of Macraucheniidae.

=== Genera ===
Sparnotheriodontidae contains the genera Victorlemoinea, Sparnotheriodon, Phoradiadus, and Notiolofos. Victorlemoinea and Sparnotheriodon may be synonymous. Soria regarded Heteroglyphis as a probable sparnotheriodontid, but McKenna and Bell and Bond et al. included it in Anisolambdinae, with the former considering it a synonym of Protheosodon.

== History of study ==
The first described sparnotheriodontid, Victorlemoinea, was named by Florentino Ameghino in 1901. In 1980, Miguel Soria named Sparnotheriodon and established the family Sparnotheriodontidae for it. He initially classified the family as belonging to Notoungulata. Sparnotheriodontids were first identified in Antarctica in 1990.

== Paleobiology, paleoecology, and paleobiogeography ==
Sparnotheriodontids lived in South America and Antarctica. Sparnotheriodontids and astrapotheres are the only clades of terrestrial placental mammals confirmed to have lived in Antarctica. Sparnotheriodontids were browsing herbivores adapted to forest environments. Their rarity in the fossil record suggests they were specialists. Sparnotheriodontids may have been ecological equivalents to Meniscotherium, which is not closely related but had similar teeth. Victorolemoinea lived during the Riochican and Itaboraian South American land mammal ages, which date to the Ypresian age of the Eocene. Notiolofos ranged from the early Eocene to the Rupelian age of the Oligocene.
