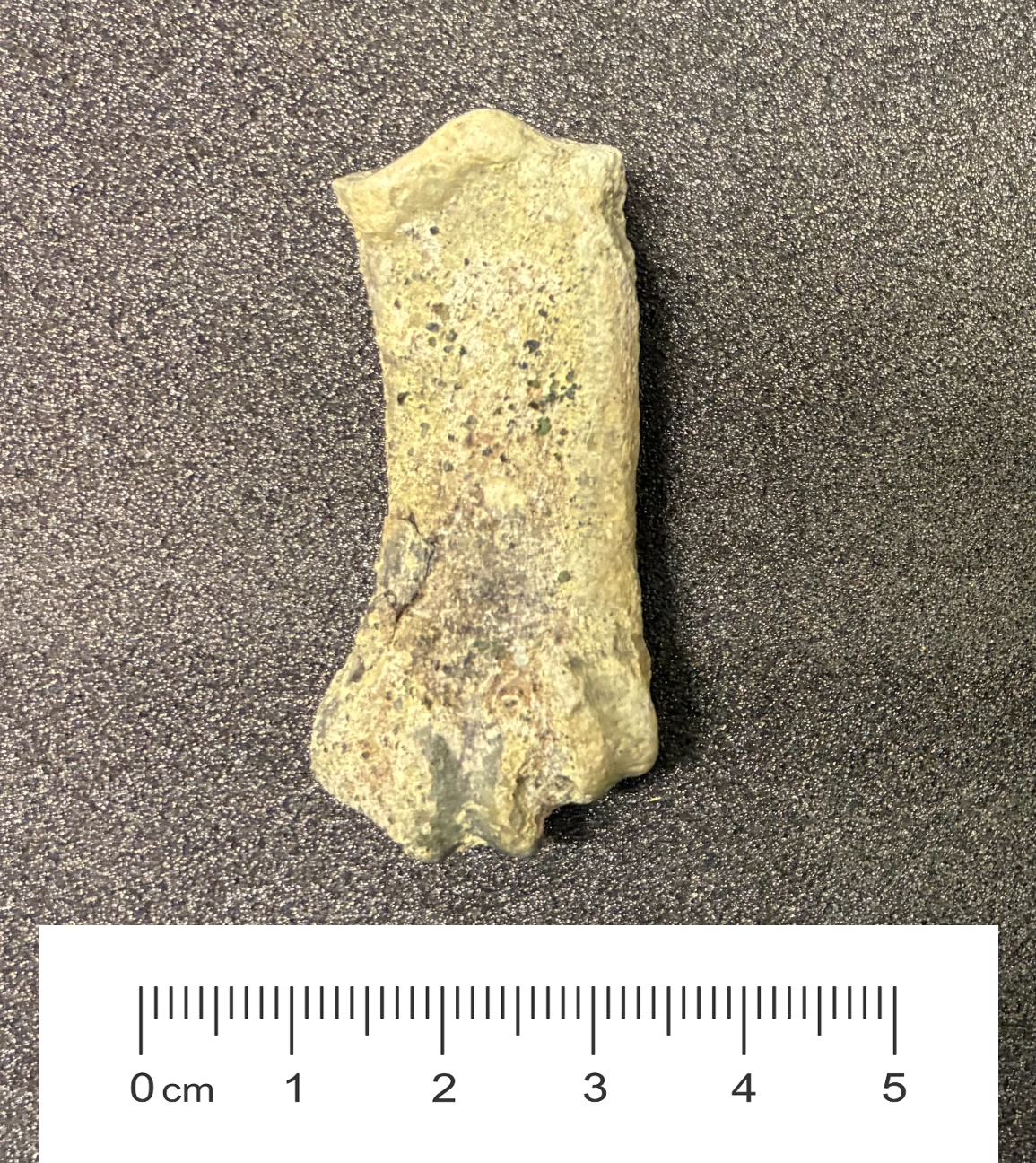
- A tarsometatarsus bone from Mesetaornis polaris

Scientific classification
- Kingdom: Animalia
- Phylum: Chordata
- Class: Aves
- Order: Sphenisciformes
- Genus: †Mesetaornis; Myrcha et al., 2002
- Species: †M. polaris

Binomial name
- †Mesetaornis polaris Myrcha et al., 2002

= Mesetaornis =

Genus of birds (fossil)

Mesetaornis is an extinct genus of penguin from the Eocene period. It contains the single species Mesetaornis polaris.
