= Adianthidae =

Adianthidae Temporal range: Eocene – Miocene, 48–16 Ma

Scientific classification
- Kingdom: Animalia
- Phylum: Chordata
- Class: Mammalia
- Order: †Litopterna
- Superfamily: †Macrauchenioidea
- Family: †Adianthidae; Ameghino, 1891

Genera
- †Adianthus; †Proadiantus; †Proectocion; †Proheptaconus; †Tricoelodus

Extinct family of mammals

Adianthidae is an extinct family of litopterns that existed from the Middle Eocene (Mustersan) to the Early Miocene (Santacrucian).

== Description ==
Adianthids were actively mobile herbivores. They were small in size when compared to most litopterns. Most species did not exceed the size of a cat. Although small in size, the adianthids showed dental features that were already specialized even in the Oligocene genera. The molars were equipped with ridges, and the upper molars were provided with crescent-shaped metacones and paracones, with a columnar parastyle and a very reduced or absent mesostyle. The lower fourth premolar was provided with a crested talonid, and the lower molars were double crescent-shaped or nearly so. The upper fourth premolar was molar-shaped, and the teeth from the third premolar to the upper third molar had three primary dimples and (in the more derived forms) a few accessory dimples behind the prostylar cingulum in front of the cingulum of the postipocone.

== Naming and reorganization ==
Adianthidae was named by Florentino Ameghino in 1891. It was renamed to Adiantidae by Jaekel in 1911 which is used comparatively less but is synonymous (not disputed). It was reranked to a subfamily Adiantinae by Bordas in 1939.

It was assigned to Litopterna (renamed by Jaekel in the same year from Litopterna) by Jaekel in 1911, to Macraucheniidae by Bordas in 1939 and to Macrauchenioidea by Cifelli in 1983 and to Litopterna by Ameghino in 1894 and 1897, by Simpson et al. in 1962, by Cifelli and Soria in 1983, by Bond and Vucetich in 1983 and by Carroll in 1988.
