= Notiolofos =

Notiolofos Temporal range: Early Eocene-Late Eocene (Riochican-Divisaderan) ~55–34 Ma

Scientific classification
- Domain: Eukaryota
- Kingdom: Animalia
- Phylum: Chordata
- Class: Mammalia
- Order: †Litopterna
- Family: †Sparnotheriodontidae
- Genus: †Notiolofos; Bond et al., 2009

Type species
- †Notiolofos arquinotiensis Bond et al. 2006

Other species
- †N. regueroi Gelfo, Lopéz & Santillana, 2017

Synonyms
- Genus synonymy: Notolophus Bond et al., 2006

Extinct genus of litopterns

Notiolofos is an extinct genus of sparnotheriodontid ungulate from the order Litopterna. The animal lived during the Eocene, in modern-day Antarctica. The genus contains two species, N. arquinotiensis, the type species, and N. regueroi.

== Description ==
Notiolofos was originally named in 2006 by Bond et al., as Notolophus arquinotiensis, on the basis of a few fossil teeth. However, after the genus was named, it became clear that the name Notolophus was already in use by a genus of moths, and the genus name was subsequently changed to Notiolofos by Bond et al. in 2009. The second species in the genus, Notiolofos regueroi, was named in 2017 by Gelfo, Lopéz & Santillana, based on a single fossil molar.

Fossils of N. arquinotiensis have been found in multiple layers of the La Meseta Formation of Seymour Island, Antarctica, and are dated from 55 to 34 million years ago. However, N. regueroi is only known from the Cucullaea I layer from the Upper Ypresian, dating to 53 million years ago. When Notiolofos lived, Antarctica was still connected to South America by a land bridge, as a remainder of the supercontinent Gondwana.

N. regueroi was around the size of a sheep, with an estimated weight of 25 to 57 kilogrammes. N. arquinotiensis was much larger, with an estimated weight of 400 kilogrammes, around the size of a muskox. It is thought to have been a browser.

== Taxonomy ==
Notiolofos is a part of the family Sparnotheriodontidae, and is most closely related to Victorlemoinea, fossils of which have been found in the Upper Paleocene and Lower Eocene of Patagonia and the Brazilian Itaboraí basin.
