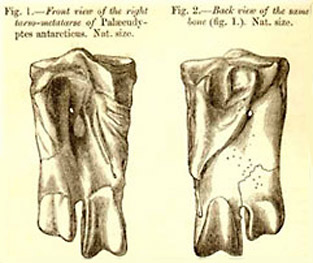
- Huxley’s original illustration of the fossil of an ankle bone from Palaeeudyptes antarcticus described in 1859.

Scientific classification
- Domain: Eukaryota
- Kingdom: Animalia
- Phylum: Chordata
- Class: Aves
- Order: Sphenisciformes
- Family: Spheniscidae
- Genus: †Palaeeudyptes
- Species: †P. antarcticus

Binomial name
- †Palaeeudyptes antarcticus Huxley, 1859

Synonyms
- Palaeeudyptes antarctica (lapsus) Lowe, 1933

= Palaeeudyptes antarcticus =

Palaeeudyptes antarcticus Temporal range: Late Eocene–Late Oligocene

Extinct species of bird

Palaeeudyptes antarcticus, also referred to as the narrow-flippered penguin, is the type species of the extinct penguin genus Palaeeudyptes. It was a huge species, albeit probably with a large size variation. Although the size range can only be loosely estimated, the birds seem to have stood between 43 and 55 inches (1.1 and 1.4 m) high in life (i.e. somewhat larger than an emperor penguin), placing this species and its congener Palaeeudyptes marplesi among the largest penguin species known. It was the last known Palaeeudyptes species, and although the exact time when it lived is not precisely determined, it may have evolved from P. marplesi, or they might even have been a single species which slightly decreased in size over time.

P. antarcticus was the first fossil penguin to become known to science. It was described from a single, slightly damaged, tarsometatarsus (BM A.1084) found in the Late Oligocene Otekaike Limestone (23-28, possibly up to 34 MYA) at Kakanui, New Zealand. An older date seems quite possible in fact as other bones have now been recovered from the Late Eocene (34-37 MYA) of the La Meseta Formation on Seymour Island, Antarctica (Tambussi et al., 2006), but given the considerable distances in age and range involved, it is not completely certain that the bones belong to a single species.

This remains the only fossil unequivocally assigned to this species, but numerous other bones have been found that may belong to it too. These fossils were once uncritically considered as being from P. antarcticus, merely because other large penguins were not known at that time, but have not been subject to scientific review according to modern standards. While some of these bones are now known to belong to other species, a large number are not unequivocally assignable to either P. antarcticus or P. marplesi, being intermediate in size (Simpson, 1971), lending support to the theory that these taxa were in reality a single species.
