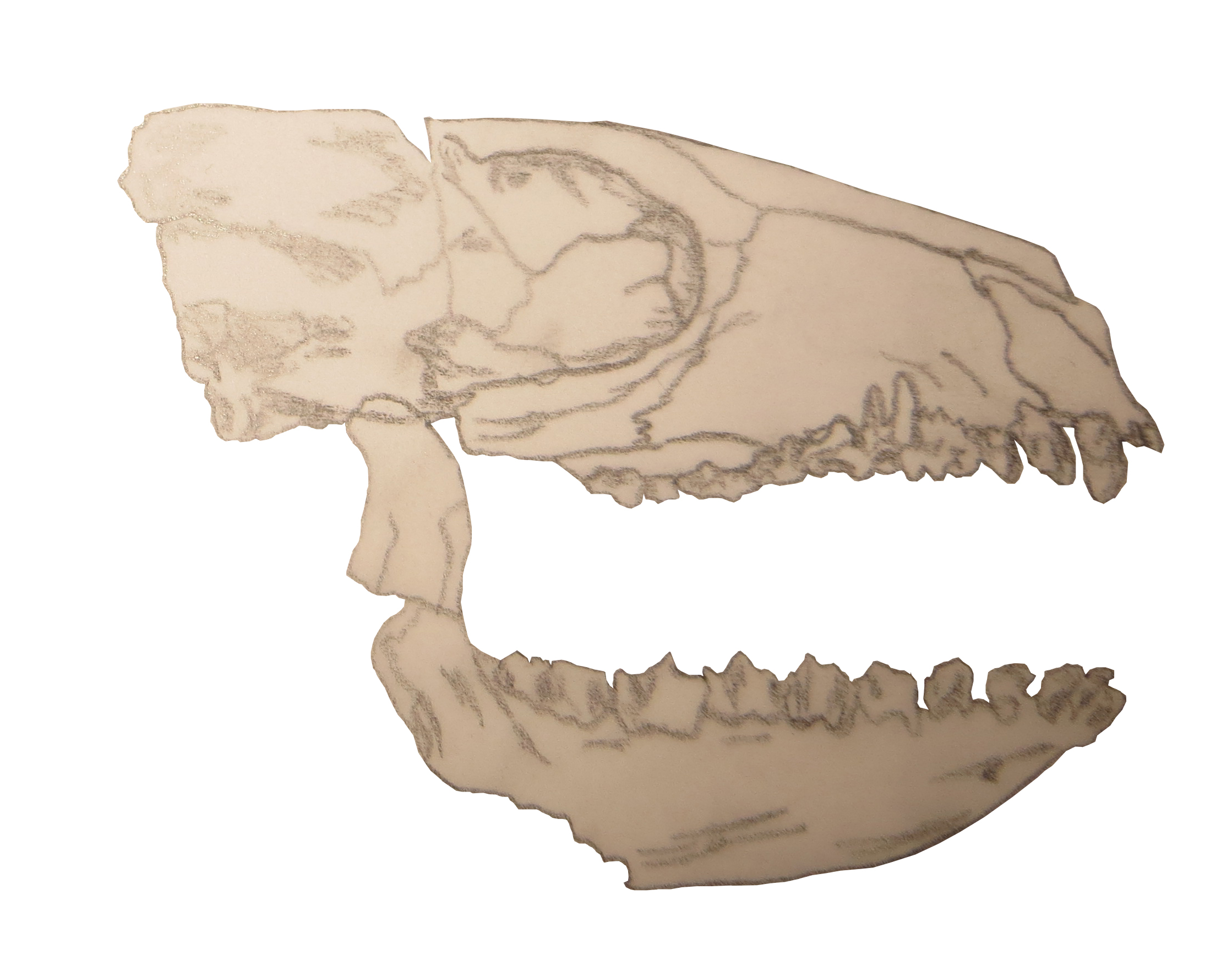
- Skull of Adiantoides leali

Scientific classification
- Kingdom: Animalia
- Phylum: Chordata
- Class: Mammalia
- Order: †Litopterna
- Family: †Indaleciidae
- Genus: †Adiantoides; Simpson & Minoprio 1949

Type species
- †Adiantoides leali Simpson & Minoprio, 1949

Species
- A. leali Simpson & Minoprio 1949; A. magnus Cifelli & Soria 1983

= Adiantoides =

Adiantoides Temporal range: Middle-Late Eocene ~37–33 Ma

Extinct genus of litopterns

Adiantoides is an extinct genus of herbivorous mammal, belonging to the order Litopterna. It lived during the Middle to Late Eocene, in South America.

== Description ==
It was a small-sized animal, only slightly larger than a cat.

The skull was rather primitive, evocating some of the Paleocene and Eocene so-called "Condylarths". The orbit was large and in a median position, the muzzle not particularly elongated and the neurocranium was rather small. The frontal bone had a small postorbital apophysis, and there was no regression of the nasal bones, contrary to what happened in other litopterns such as Cramauchenia. There was an enigmatic element near the basisphenoid, suggesting a special structure in the auditory region.

The mandibular symphysis was robust. The dentition was complete and brachydont, the first two upper incisors were small, while the third was well developed, and the canine was slightly larger than the third incisor. The premolars progressively grew in size from the first to the fourth, and there was a strong fold in the parastyle.

== Classification ==
Adiantoides was first described in 1949, based on fossils including a nearly complete skull and a mandible from the Mendoza Province of Argentina. The type species is Adiantoides leali, from the Late Eocene. Subsequently, in 1983, Adiantoides magnus was described, based on a mandible from the Middle Eocene locality Cañadón Vaca in the Sarmiento Formation, in the Chubut Province of Argentina.

Adiantoides is the best known genus of the Adianthidae, a group of small sized litopterns with characteristic teeth. In particular, Adiantoides may be related to the basal Indalecia, and both genera are place within the subfamily Indaleciinae. However, many more recent studies have considered Indaleciidae a separate family.
