= Richard L. Cifelli =

American biologist and vertebrate paleontologist

- Born: 1954 (age 71–72); Centralia, Washington, United States
- Education: Columbia University (PhD)
- Known for: Research on early mammals and vertebrates of the Cretaceous
- Scientific career
- Fields: Biology, Vertebrate paleontology
- Workplaces: University of Oklahoma

Richard Lawrence Cifelli (born 1954) is an American Professor Emeritus of Biology and Curator Emeritus of Vertebrate Paleontology in the Department of Biology and at the Sam Noble Oklahoma Museum of Natural History at the University of Oklahoma.

== Education and career ==
Cifelli began his studies in the Department of Sociology at Colby College in Maine, where he graduated with an AB in 1976. He then joined the Department of Anthropology at the University of Chicago. After graduating with an AM in 1979, he joined the Department of Geological Sciences at Columbia University, where he received an M.Phil. in 1980 and a PhD in 1983. Cifelli did post-doctoral research as a Fellow-in-Residence in the Division of Mammals at the Smithsonian Institution, from 1983–1985.

Cifelli began his career as an archaeologist at the University of Alaska in 1974, later moving into vertebrate paleontology.

He joined the University of Oklahoma in 1986, where he was the Presidential Professor of Biology and curator at the Sam Noble Museum. He is currently Professor Emeritus and Curator Emeritus at the university and the museum. Cifelli was editor or associate editor for scientific journals including the Journal of Vertebrate Paleontology, Proceedings of the Royal Society, and Acta Palaeontologica Polonica.

== Research ==
Cifelli's research has focused on the anatomy and evolution of vertebrates, primarily fossil mammals. His early studies concerned biogeography and patterns of evolution, themes he returned to later in his career. His dissertation research, with follow-up studies through the late 1990s, treated fossil hooved mammals native to South America, and included some of the first explicit hypotheses of relationships within several groups, together with paleobiological studies based on functional anatomy.

His recent work focuses on the systematics and paleobiology of terrestrial vertebrates, primarily mammals, from the Cretaceous of the United States.

Cifelli is known for his collection and study of mammals and other vertebrates from the Cretaceous of western North America. Cifelli is the author of about 100 species of fossil vertebrates. He contributed to the discovery and analysis of fossil assemblages from formations including Cloverly, Lakota, Cedar Mountain, and the Big Bend region. Many of these specimens are housed at the Sam Noble Oklahoma Museum of Natural History.

Cifelli has authored or co-authored between 150–200 publications, including peer-reviewed articles and book chapters. He is co-author of the 2004 book Mammals from the Age of Dinosaurs: Origins, Evolution, and Structure, published by Columbia University Press. Other edited volumes include Vertebrate Paleontology in the Neotropics: The Miocene Fauna of La Venta, Colombia, published by the Smithsonian Institution Press.

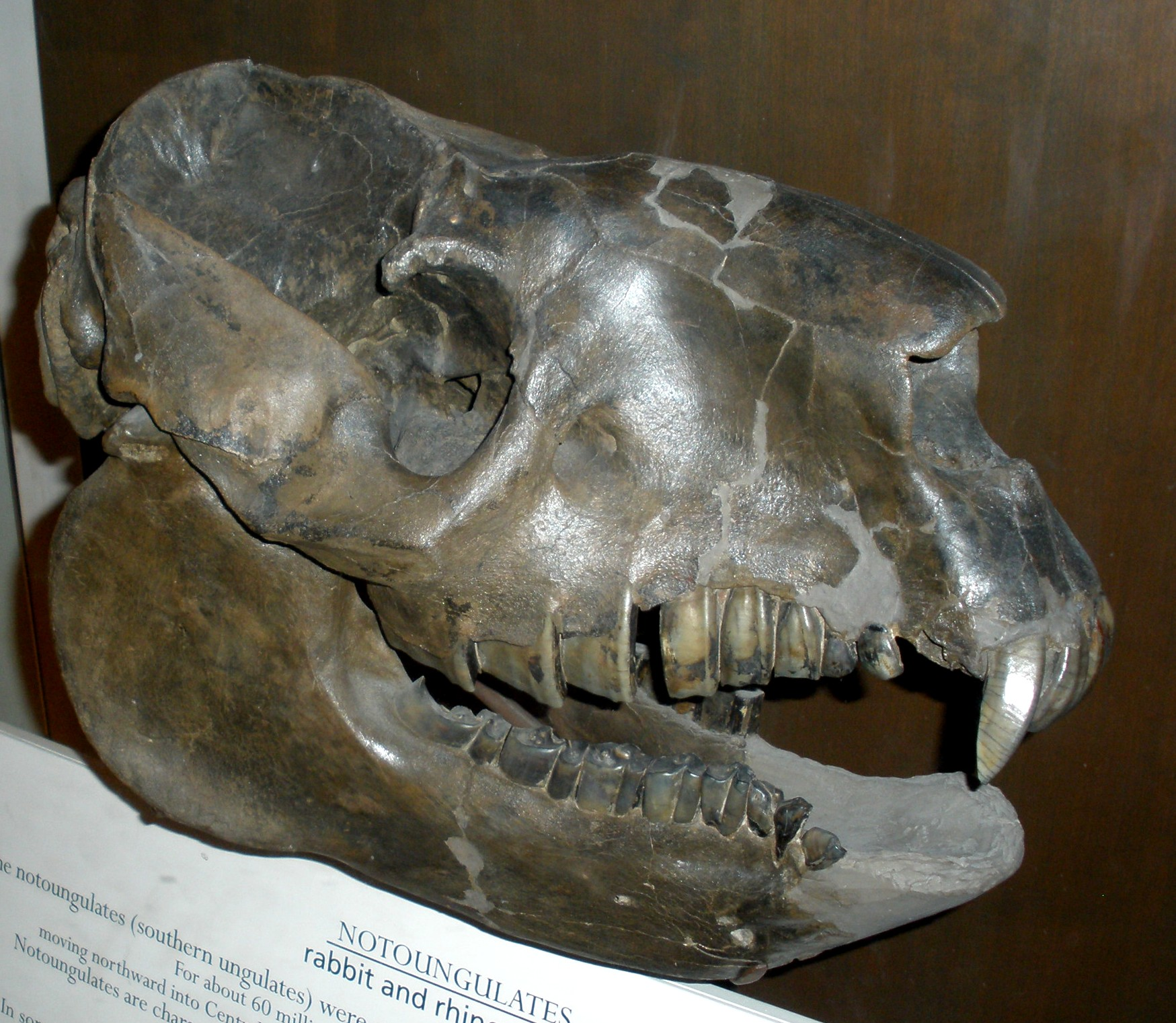
Skull of Nesodon imbricatus, a notoungulate mammal studied by Cifelli

== Awards ==
Cifelli received the Regents' Award for Superior Research and Creative Activity from the University of Oklahoma in 1995, followed by a Presidential Professorship in 1996 and the Director's Research Award from the Sam Noble Museum in 2000.

In 1995, the Society of Vertebrate Paleontology presented him with a Plenary Award for contributions to the Journal of Vertebrate Paleontology. He was awarded the Joseph T. Gregory Award in 2016 for his service to the field.

Fossil species named after him include Cifellilestes ciscoensis and Cifellitherium suderlandicum, both described in 2022.
