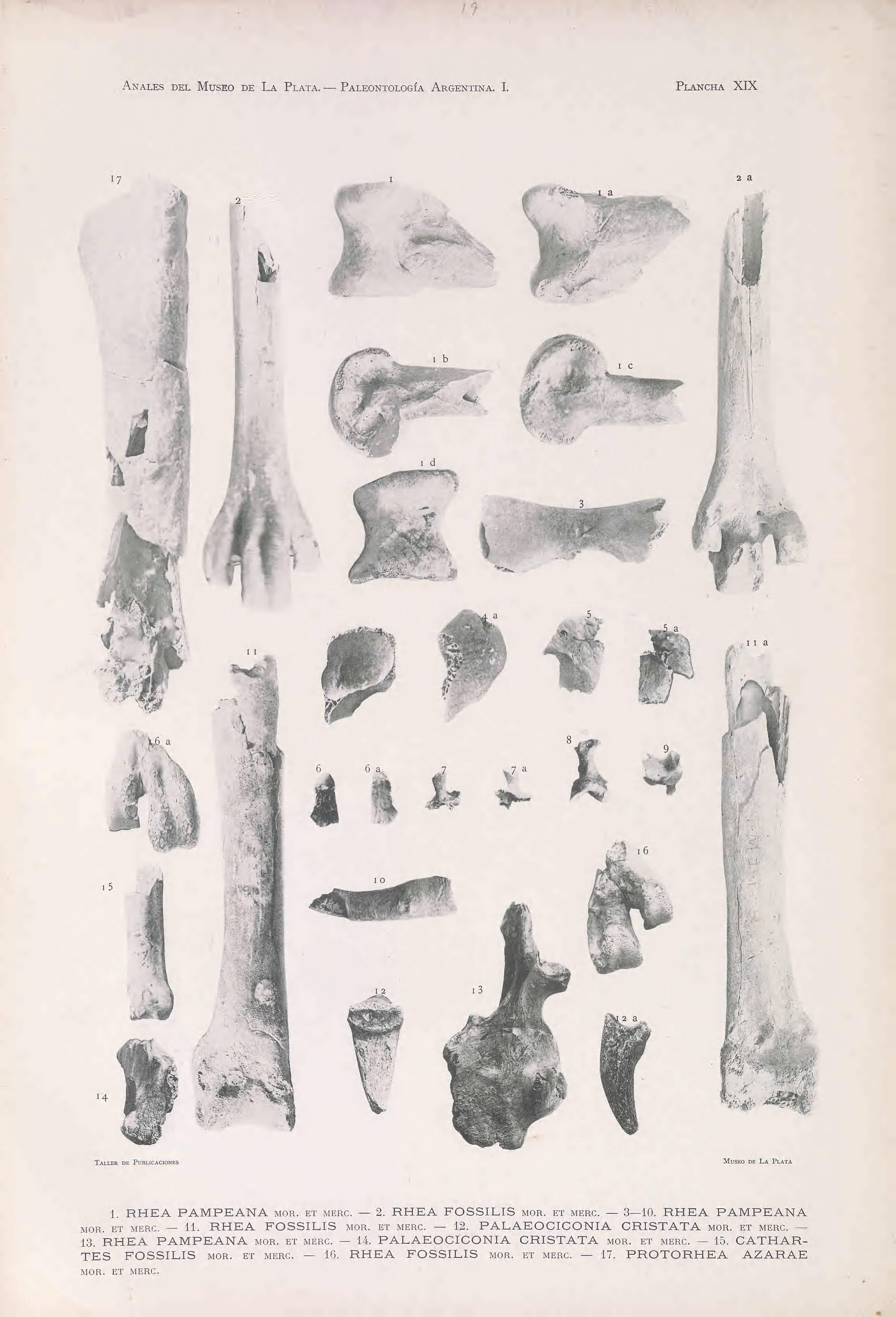
- Illustrations of various bird fossils from the 1891 "Annuals of the La Plata Museum", the Rhea fossilis specimens are the two long bones in the second column.

Scientific classification
- Kingdom: Animalia
- Phylum: Chordata
- Class: Aves
- Infraclass: Palaeognathae
- Order: Rheiformes
- Family: Rheidae
- Genus: Rhea
- Species: †R. fossilis

Binomial name
- †Rhea fossilis Moreno & Mercerat 1891

= Rhea fossilis =

Rhea fossilis Temporal range: 23–2.6 Ma

Extinct species of bird

Rhea fossilis is an extinct species of bird in the genus Rhea that inhabited the Southern Cone of South America during the Neogene period. Its closest living relatives are the greater rhea and the lesser rhea.

== Naming and discovery ==
Rhea fossilis is only known by a couple of fossils, a tibia and tarsometatarsus, discovered by Alcide Mercerat and Francisco Moreno in 1891. They were some of the first paleontologists to describe and catalogue the rhea fossil record. From the fossils found, he and Mercerat determined it to be a transitional species between the greater rhea and the lesser rhea. They also inferred it was the same size as modern-day rheas.

== Paleoecology ==
Rhea fossilis is very similar to its extant relatives, albeit slighter more slender. It inhabited the grassland and scrub forest of the Pampas region of Argentina. During this time, the area was warmer and wetter than it is today. Like its living cousins that still inhabit the region today, it fed on broad-leaved plants, fruits, seeds, and small animals, such as lizards. Rhea fossilis would have likely been preyed upon by terror birds and other apex predators of the region.
