= Rhea mesopotamica =

Rhea mesopotamica Temporal range: Late Miocene, 7–5.5 Ma

Scientific classification
- Domain: Eukaryota
- Kingdom: Animalia
- Phylum: Chordata
- Class: Aves
- Infraclass: Palaeognathae
- Order: Rheiformes
- Family: Rheidae
- Genus: Rhea
- Species: †R. mesopotamica

Binomial name
- †Rhea mesopotamica (Agnolín & Noriega, 2012)

Synonyms
- Rhea (Pterocnemia) mesopotamica; Pterocnemia mesopotamica

Extinct species of bird

Rhea mesopotamica is an extinct species of bird in the genus Rhea, whose living species are known as suris, rhea, or choiques. It lived in the Southern Cone of South America.

== Taxonomy ==
This species was originally described in 2012 by paleontologists Federico L. Agnolín and Jorge I. Noriega, under the scientific name of Pterocnemia mesopotamica. This generic taxon is mostly considered to be included in Rhea, and P. mesopotamica was formally assigned to the genus Rhea by Tambussi, Degrange & De Mendoza (2023).

Holotype

The designated holotype is cataloged as: MACN-Pv 12743, and consists of the distal end of the right tarsometatarsus. It is deposited in the paleontological collections of the Argentine Museum of Natural Sciences "Bernardino Rivadavia" (MACN), located in the city of Buenos Aires, Argentina. The following materials are also referred:

- 41-XII-13-928 (distal end of left tarsometatarsus);
- MACN-Pv 12735 (distal end of right tarsometatarsus);
- MACN-Pv 12737 (distal end of juvenile left tarsometatarsus);
- MACN-Pv 12740 (distal end of juvenile left tarsometatarsus without trochlea IV).

In the same location and horizon, fragmentary remains of a femur and a humerus were also found, identified as Rheidae indet.

Type locality

The type locality is ravines of the Paraná Toma Vieja River, north of the city of Paraná, province of Entre Ríos, in the Mesopotamian region of northeast Argentina.

Estimated characteristics

The remains found are thought to have belonged to a bird with a thin and small body, and a similar appearance to that of the short rhea or Patagonian rhea (R. pennata), and is characterized by the marked divergence of the tarsometatarsal trochlea.

Etymology

Etymologically, the specific term is a toponym that refers to the region from which the type specimen comes: Argentine Mesopotamia.

== Geographic distribution, age, and stratigraphic origin ==
Their remains were exhumed in strata corresponding to the base of the Ituzaingó Formation, levels that are informally denominated as "Ossiferous Conglomerate" or "Mesopotamian", which outcrops in the Entre Rios ravines of the Paraná River. These sedimentary deposits were attributed an antiquity corresponding to the late Miocene or higher ( Huayquerian Age).

Another material, referred to as: FMNH-PA-36 (MHNT s / nº, copy of the previous one), is an isolated complete left tarsometatarsus, collected in 1952 by José Luis Minoprio and Bryan Patterson. It comes geographically from the Corral El Aguacito area, close to the Zitro Mine, 3.5 km north of the Atuel River canyon, in the province of Mendoza (central-western Argentina). It comes stratigraphically from the Aisol Formation, which is ascribed to the middle to late Miocene. Due to its characteristics, it was assigned to: Pterocnemia cf. P. mesopotamica (= Rhea cf. R. mesopotamica). In case of belonging to this species, its biochron begins to extend into the past, being then understood from the late Miocene (Huayquerian Age) to the Middle Miocene (Friasense Age).
