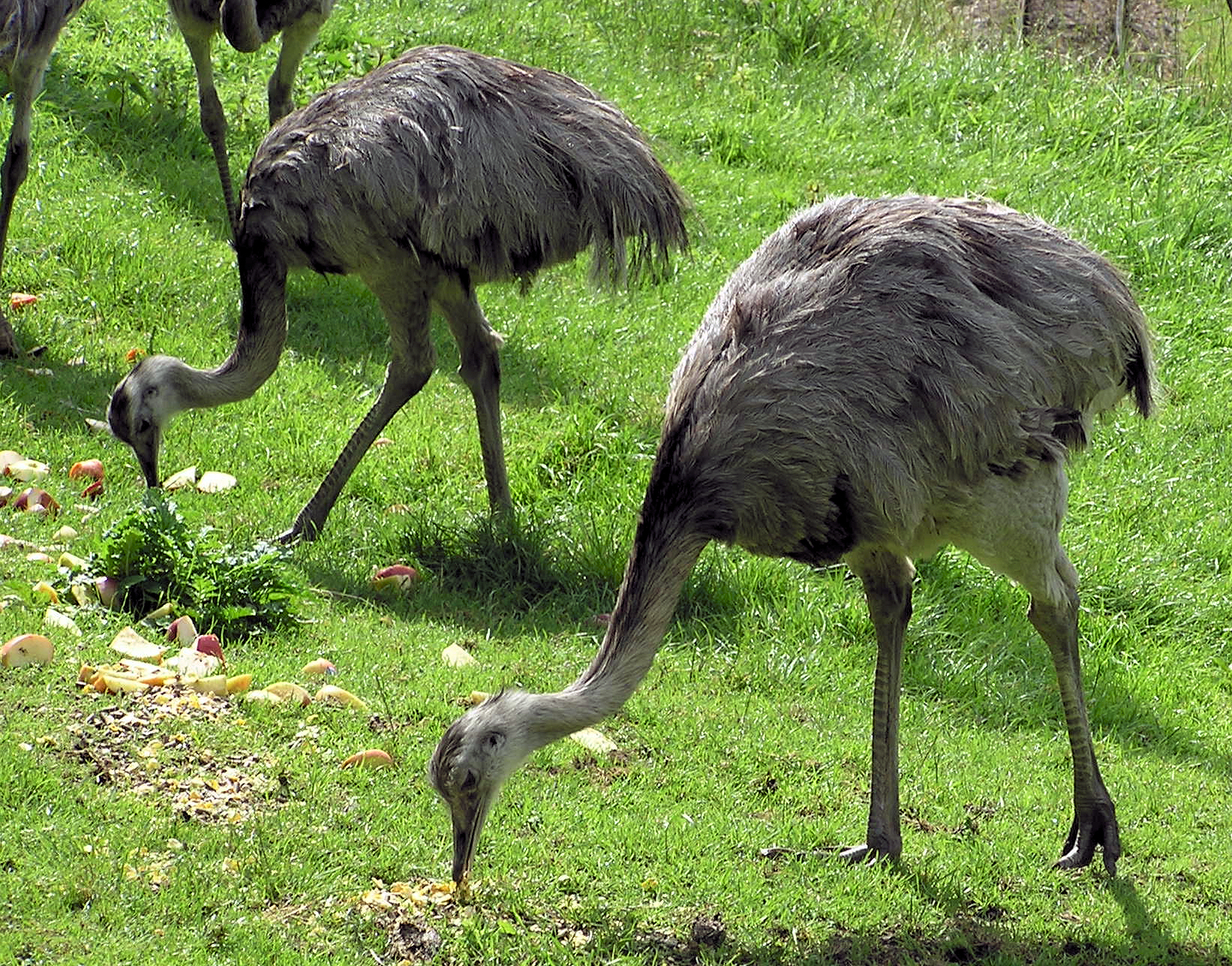
- Two greater rheas

Scientific classification
- Kingdom: Animalia
- Phylum: Chordata
- Class: Aves
- Infraclass: Palaeognathae
- Order: Rheiformes
- Family: Rheidae
- Genus: Rhea; Brisson, 1760

Type species
- Struthio americanus Linnaeus, 1758

Species
- †R. anchorenense; †R. fossilis; †R. mesopotamica; †R. subpampeana; R. americana American rhea; R. pennata Darwin's rhea; R. tarapacensis Puna rhea (disputed)

Synonyms
- Rhea Moehring, 1752 pre-Linnaean; Touyou Lacépède, 1799; Tuyus Rafinesque, 1815; Pterocnemia G.R. Gray, 1870

= Rhea (bird) =

Rheas Temporal range: Messinian-Present 7–0 Ma

Genus of birds

The rhea (/ˈriːə/ REE-ə), also known as the ñandú (Note: alternatively spelt nandoo, nhandu, or nandu) (/njænˈduː/ nyan-DOO) is a South American ratite (flightless bird without a keel on the sternum bone) of the order Rheiformes. Rheas are distantly related to the two African ostriches and Australia's emu (the largest, second-largest and third-largest living ratites, respectively), with rheas placing just behind the emu in height and overall size.

Most taxonomic authorities recognize two extant species: the greater, or American, rhea (Rhea americana); and the lesser, or Darwin's, rhea (Rhea pennata). The International Union for Conservation of Nature (IUCN) classifies the puna rhea as another species instead of a subspecies of the lesser rhea. The IUCN currently rates the greater and puna rheas as near-threatened in their native ranges, while Darwin's rhea is of least concern, having recovered from past threats to its survival. In addition, the feral population of the greater rhea in Germany appears to be growing. However, control efforts are underway and seem to succeed in controlling the birds' population growth. Similarly to ostriches and emus, rheas are fairly popular livestock and pets, regularly kept and bred on farms, ranches, private parks, and by aviculturists, mainly in North and South America and Europe.

== Etymology ==
The name "rhea" was used in 1752 by Paul Möhring and adopted as the English common name. Möhring named the bird after the Greek Titan Rhea, whose Ancient Greek name (Ῥέα) is thought to come from ἔρα (éra, "ground"). This was fitting with the rhea being a flightless ground bird. Depending on the South American region, the rhea is known locally as ñandú guazu (Guaraní –or related Tupi nhandú-gûasú– meaning "big spider" most probably concerning their habit of opening and lowering alternate wings when they run), ema (Portuguese), suri (Aymara and Quechua), or choique (Mapudungun). Nandu is the common name in many European languages and may sometimes be heard in English.

== Taxonomy and systematics ==
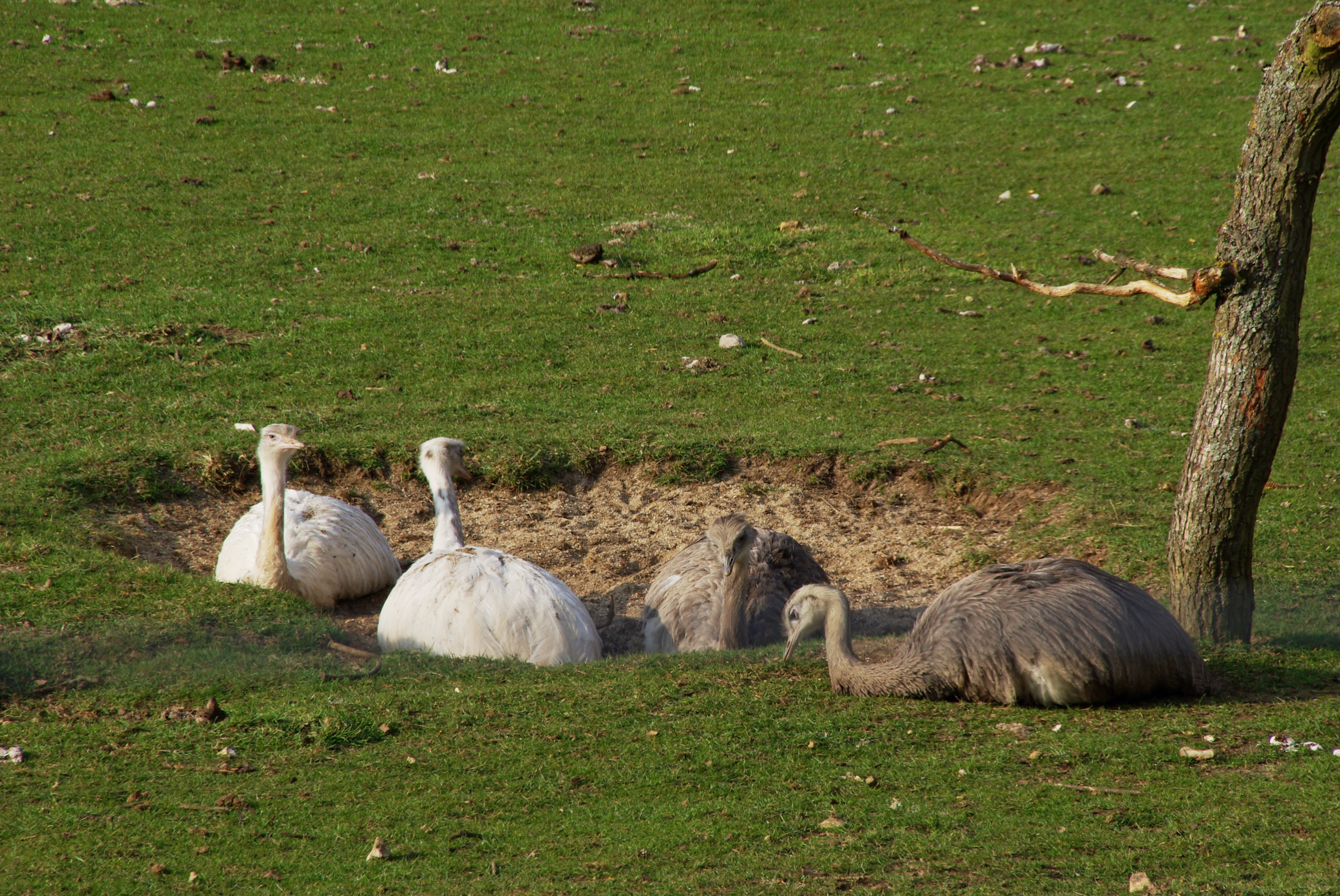
Greater rheas (Rhea americana) dustbathing at Marwell Zoo: The two individuals on the left are leucistic.

The genus Rhea was introduced by French zoologist Mathurin Jacques Brisson in 1760 with the greater rhea (Rhea americana) as the type species.

=== Extant species ===
The genus contains two extant species and eight subspecies, although one subspecies is disputed:

Genus Rhea – Brisson, 1760 – two species
Common name	Scientific name and subspecies	Range	IUCN status and estimated population
Greater rhea	Rhea americana (Linnaeus, 1758) Five subspecies: R. a. americana (Linnaeus, 1758), live in the cerrados (bushlands) and caatinga of central and eastern Brazil.; R. a. intermedia Rothschild & Chubb 1914, intermediate rhea of southeastern Brazil in Rio Grande do Sul and Uruguay; R. a. nobilis Brodkorb 1939, eastern Paraguay, east of Rio Paraguay; R. a. araneipes Brodkorb 1938, chaco of Paraguay to Bolivia and Mato Grosso in Brazil; R. a. albescens Lynch & Holmberg 1878, plains of Argentina south of Rio Negro	Argentina, Bolivia, Brazil, Paraguay and Uruguay	NT
Darwin's rhea or lesser rhea	Rhea pennata d'Orbigny, 1834 Two subspecies: R. p. garleppi (Chubb 1913), puna/Garlepp's rhea of southeastern Peru, southwestern Bolivia and northwestern Argentina. It is included in R. tarapacensis by The International Union for Conservation of Nature (IUCN).; R. p. pennata d'Orbigny 1834, Darwin's lesser rhea of Patagonian steppes in southern Argentina and southern Chile	Altiplano and Patagonia in South America	LC

Rhea pennata was not always in the genus Rhea. In 2008, the SACC, the last holdout, approved merging the genera Rhea and Pterocnemia on August 7, 2008. This merging of genera leaves only the genus Rhea. A former fourth species of rhea, Rhea nana, was described by Lydekker in 1894 based on a single egg found in Patagonia, but today no major authorities consider it valid.

=== Fossils ===
- †R. anchorenense (Ameghino & Rusconi 1932) [Rhea americana anchorenense Amcghino & Rusconi 1932]
- †R. fossilis (Moreno & Mercerat 1891) [Pterocnemia fossilis (Moreno & Mercerat 1891); Rhea pampeana (Moreno & Mercerat 1891)]
- †R. mesopotamica (Agnolín & Noriega 2012) [Pterocnemia mesopotamica Agnolín & Noriega 2012]
- †R. subpampeana Moreno & Mercerat 1891

== Description ==
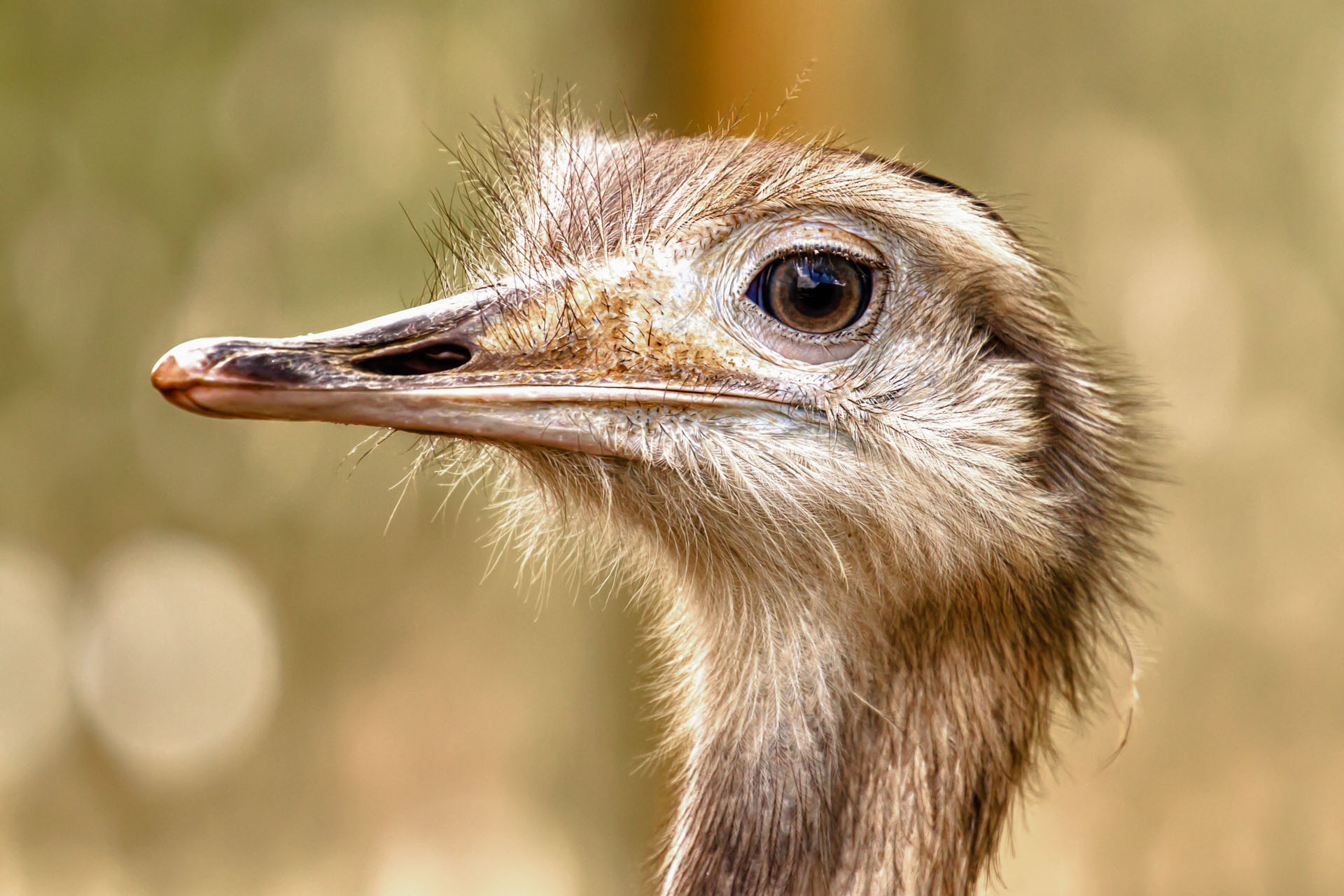
Greater rhea head close up

Rheas are large, flightless birds with grey-brown plumage, long legs, and long necks, similar to an ostrich. Large males of R. americana can reach 170 cm (67 in) tall at the head, 100 cm (39 in) at the back and can weigh up to 40 kg (88 lb). The lesser rhea is smaller, with a height of 100 cm (39 in). Their wings are large for a flightless bird (250 cm (8.2 ft)) and are spread while running, to act like sails. Unlike most birds, rheas have only three toes. Their tarsus has 18 to 22 horizontal plates on the front of it. They also store urine separately in an expansion of the cloaca.

== Distribution and habitat ==
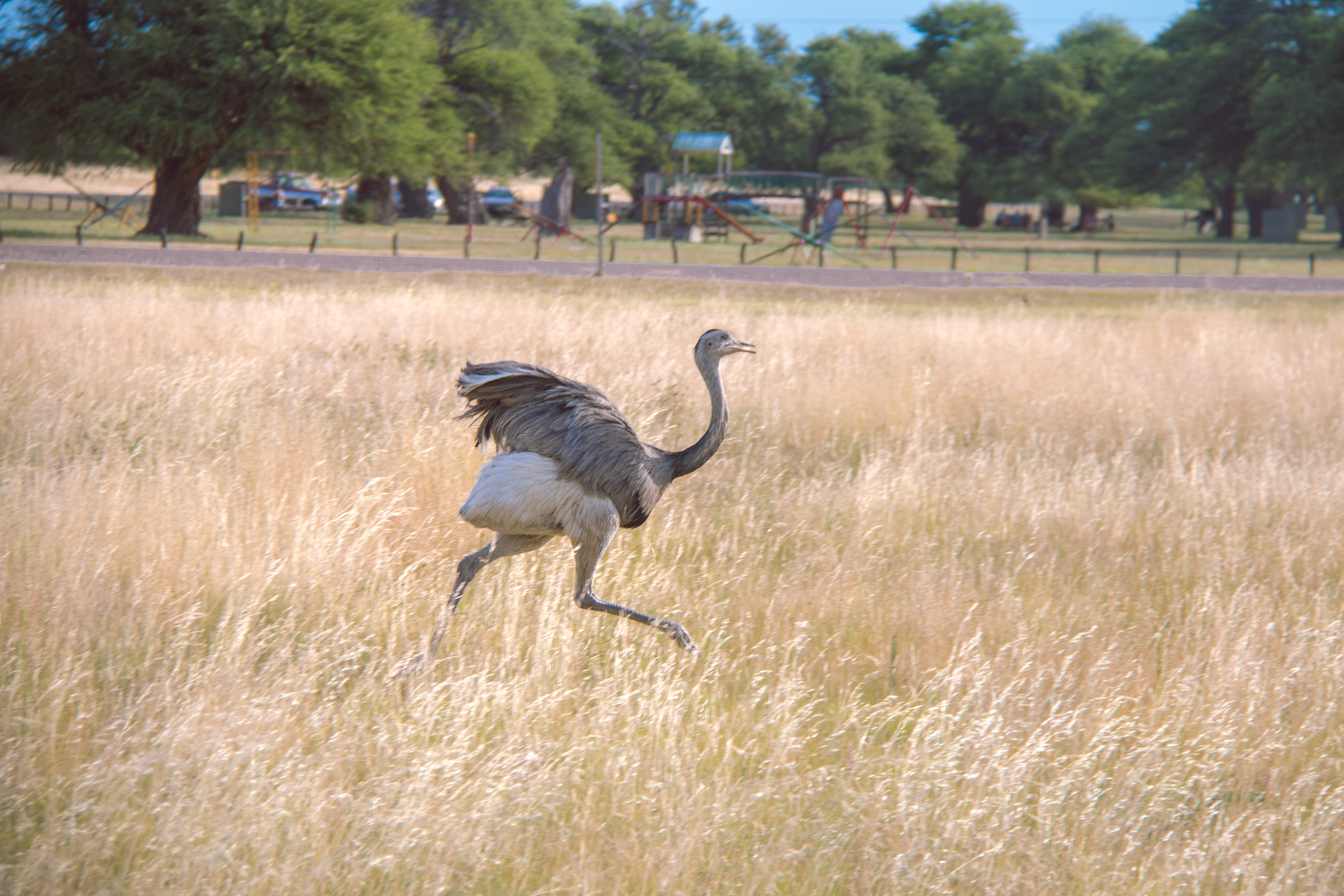
A rhea at the Parque Luro, Argentina

Rheas are from South America only and are limited within the continent to Argentina, Bolivia, Brazil, Chile, Paraguay, Peru and Uruguay. They are grassland birds, and both species prefer open land. The greater rheas live in open grasslands, pampas and chaco woodlands. They prefer to breed near water and prefer lowlands, seldom going above 1,500 metres (4,900 ft). On the other hand, the lesser rhea will inhabit most shrubland, grassland, even desert salt puna up to 4,500 metres (14,800 ft).

=== Feral populations in Europe ===
A small population of rheas has emerged in Mecklenburg-Western Pomerania, northeastern Germany, after several couples escaped from an exotic meat farm near Lübeck in the late 1990s. Contrary to expectations, the large birds adapted well to conditions in the German countryside. A monitoring system has been in place since 2008. By 2014, there was already a population of well over 100 birds in an area of 150 square kilometres (58 sq mi) between the river Wakenitz and the A20 motorway, slowly expanding eastward.

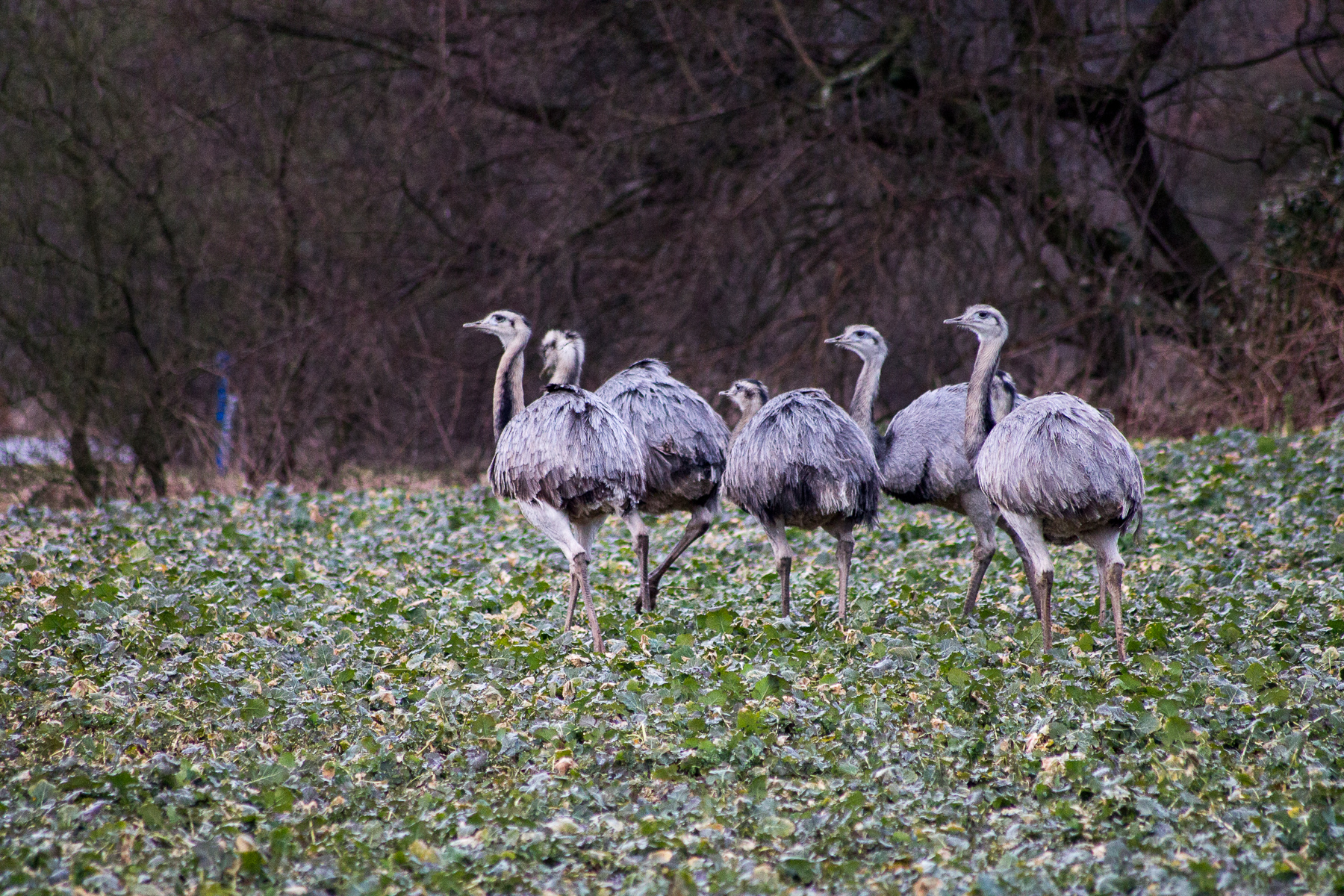
Feral greater rhea flock in Germany

The population grew steadily for several years. By autumn 2018, their numbers had significantly increased to about 600. As such, local farmers claim increasing damage to their fields, and some biologists say the rheas pose a growing risk to local wildlife. Still protected by German natural conservation law, a local discussion developed regarding how to handle the situation. Eventually, Mecklenburg-Western Pomerania's government allowed limited hunting of the birds, explicitly to just reduce the population's growth and not to wipe them out. At this point, it was generally agreed that the rheas should be allowed to stay in the region. By spring 2021, just 247 rheas were counted; this development was attributed to both the hunting and the increased caution of the animals. Several had begun to avoid humans more than previously and retreated into the woods. Some members of this rhea population have also expanded into other areas; at least twice individual rheas who probably originated in Mecklenburg-Western Pomerania were sighted in Brandenburg's High Fläming Nature Park, over 200 kilometres (120 mi) from their usual range. By early 2023, 91 rheas were counted in Mecklenburg-Western Pomerania; the population decline was attributed to both hunting as well as harsher weather of previous years. By this point, German authorities believed a stable population of 50 adult birds would be optimal for the local ecosystem and agriculture. Researchers concluded that the feral population was subject to substantial fluctuations but remained healthy, adaptable, and entrenched in the area.

There also appears to be a small population of wild rheas in the United Kingdom. In March 2021, about 20 rheas were reportedly running free on a residential estate in Hertfordshire. Local police could not identify any owner, so they assumed they were wild birds. Once caught, authorities intend to place them in a suitable nature reserve to allow them to develop as a colony.

== Behavior ==
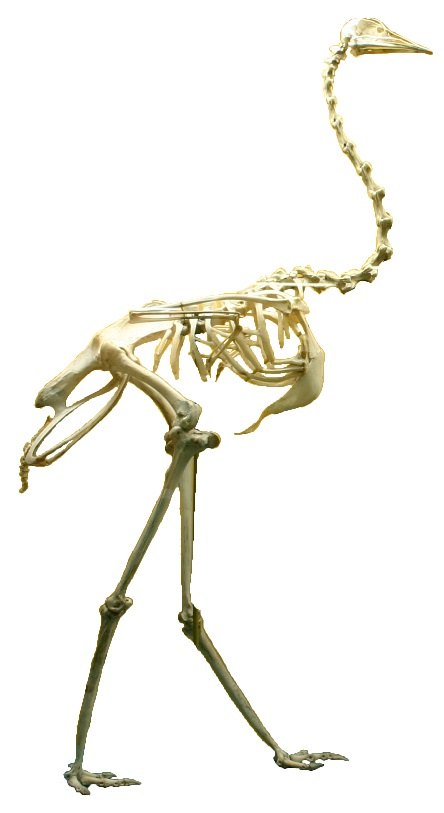
Rhea skeleton

=== Individual and flocking ===
Rheas tend to be silent birds, except when they are chicks or the male seeks a mate. During the breeding season, the male will attempt to attract females by calling. This call is a loud booming noise. While calling like this, they will lift the front of their body and ruffle their plumage, all while keeping their neck stiff. They will then extend and raise their wings and run short distances, alternating with their wings. He may then single out a female and walk alongside or in front of her with a lowered head and spread wings. If the female notices him, he will wave his neck back and forth in a figure eight. Finally, a female may offer herself, and copulation will commence.

During the non-breeding season they may form flocks of between 20 and 25 birds, although the lesser rhea forms smaller flocks than this. When in danger, they flee in a zigzag course, using one wing and the other, similar to a rudder. During the breeding season, the flocks break up.

=== Diet ===
Mostly, rheas are herbivorous and prefer broad-leafed plants, but they also eat fruits, seeds, roots, and insects such as grasshoppers, small reptiles, and rodents. Young rheas eat only insects for the first few days. Outside the breeding season, they gather in flocks and feed with deer and cattle.

=== Reproduction ===
Rheas are polygynandrous, with males courting between two and twelve females and females commonly mating with multiple dominant males during the breeding season. After mating, the male builds a nest where each female lays eggs. The nest is a simple scrape in the ground, lined with grass and leaves. The male incubates from ten to sixty eggs. The male will use a decoy system and place some eggs outside the nest, then sacrifice these to predators so they do not attempt to get inside the nest. The male may use another subordinate male to incubate his eggs while he finds another group of females to start a second nest with. The chicks hatch within 36 hours of each other. Right before hatching, the chicks begin to whistle. The group of females, meanwhile, may move on and mate with other males. While caring for the young, the males will charge at any perceived threat approaching the chicks, including female rheas and humans. The young reach full adult size in about six months but do not breed until they reach two years of age.

== Status and conservation ==
The numbers of the greater and puna rhea are decreasing as their habitats shrink. Both are considered near threatened by the IUCN. The IUCN also states that they are both approaching vulnerable status. The lesser rhea is classified as least concern.

== Human interaction ==
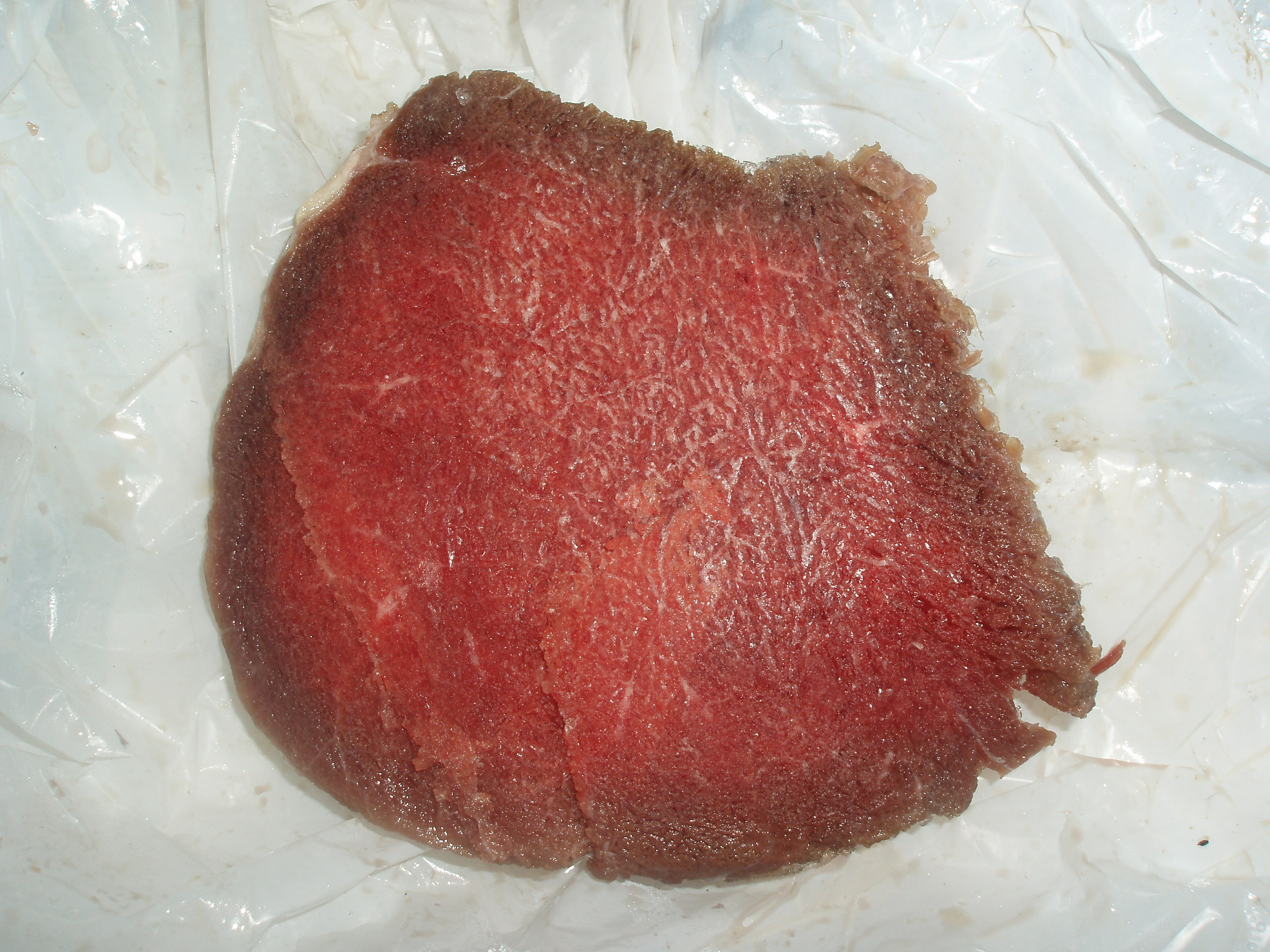
Rhea meat

Rheas have many uses in South America. Feathers are used for feather dusters, skins are used for cloaks or leather, and their meat is a staple to many people.

Gauchos traditionally hunt rheas on horseback, throwing bolas or boleadoras—a throwing device consisting of three balls joined by rope—at their legs, which immobilises the bird. The rhea is pictured on Argentina's 1-centavo coin minted in 1987, and on the Uruguayan 5-peso coin.
