= Heterorhea =

Heterorhea Temporal range: Pliocene (Chapadmalalan) ~4–3 Ma

Scientific classification
- Domain: Eukaryota
- Kingdom: Animalia
- Phylum: Chordata
- Class: Aves
- Infraclass: Palaeognathae
- Order: Rheiformes
- Family: Rheidae
- Genus: †Heterorhea; Rovereto 1914

Type species
- Heterorhea dabbenei Rovereto 1914

Species
- H. dabbenei Rovereto 1914

Extinct genus of birds

Heterorhea is an extinct genus of ratites in the rhea family. The type species is H. dabbenei. from the Late Pliocene Monte Hermoso Formation, Buenos Aires, Argentina. The holotype of the genus is missing.
