= Opisthodactylus =

Opisthodactylus Temporal range: Early-Late Miocene (Colhuehuapian-Montehermosan) ~20–3 Ma

Scientific classification
- Kingdom: Animalia
- Phylum: Chordata
- Class: Aves
- Infraclass: Palaeognathae
- Order: Rheiformes
- Family: †Opisthodactylidae
- Genus: †Opisthodactylus; Ameghino 1891

Species
- † O. patagonicus Ameghino 1891 (type); † O. horacioperezi Agnolin & Chafrat 2015; † O. kirchneri Noriega et al. 2017

Extinct genus of birds

Opisthodactylus is an extinct genus of rheiform bird from the Early to Middle Miocene Santa Cruz and Chichinales Formations and the Late Miocene (Montehermosan) Andalhuala Formation of Argentina. Three species are described: the type species, O. patagonicus, O. kirchneri and O. horacioperezi. The species O. kirchneri was described in 2017 by Noriega et al. Fossils of O. horacioperezi were found together with fossils of Patagorhacos terrificus.
