= Hinasuri =

Hinasuri Temporal range: Montehermosan

Scientific classification
- Domain: Eukaryota
- Kingdom: Animalia
- Phylum: Chordata
- Class: Aves
- Infraclass: Palaeognathae
- Order: Rheiformes
- Family: Rheidae
- Genus: †Hinasuri; Tambussi 1995

Type species
- Hinasuri nehuensis Tambussi 1995

Species
- H. nehuensis Tambussi 1995

Extinct genus of birds

Hinasuri is an extinct genus of rheid from the Montehermosan. Its fossils have been found in the Monte Hermoso Formation of Buenos Aires Province, Argentina. The type species is H. nehuensis. Hinasuri was a robust rheid bird, living at a time of increasingly extreme temperatures and decreased precipitation in the Pampean region during the Pliocene–Pleistocene.
