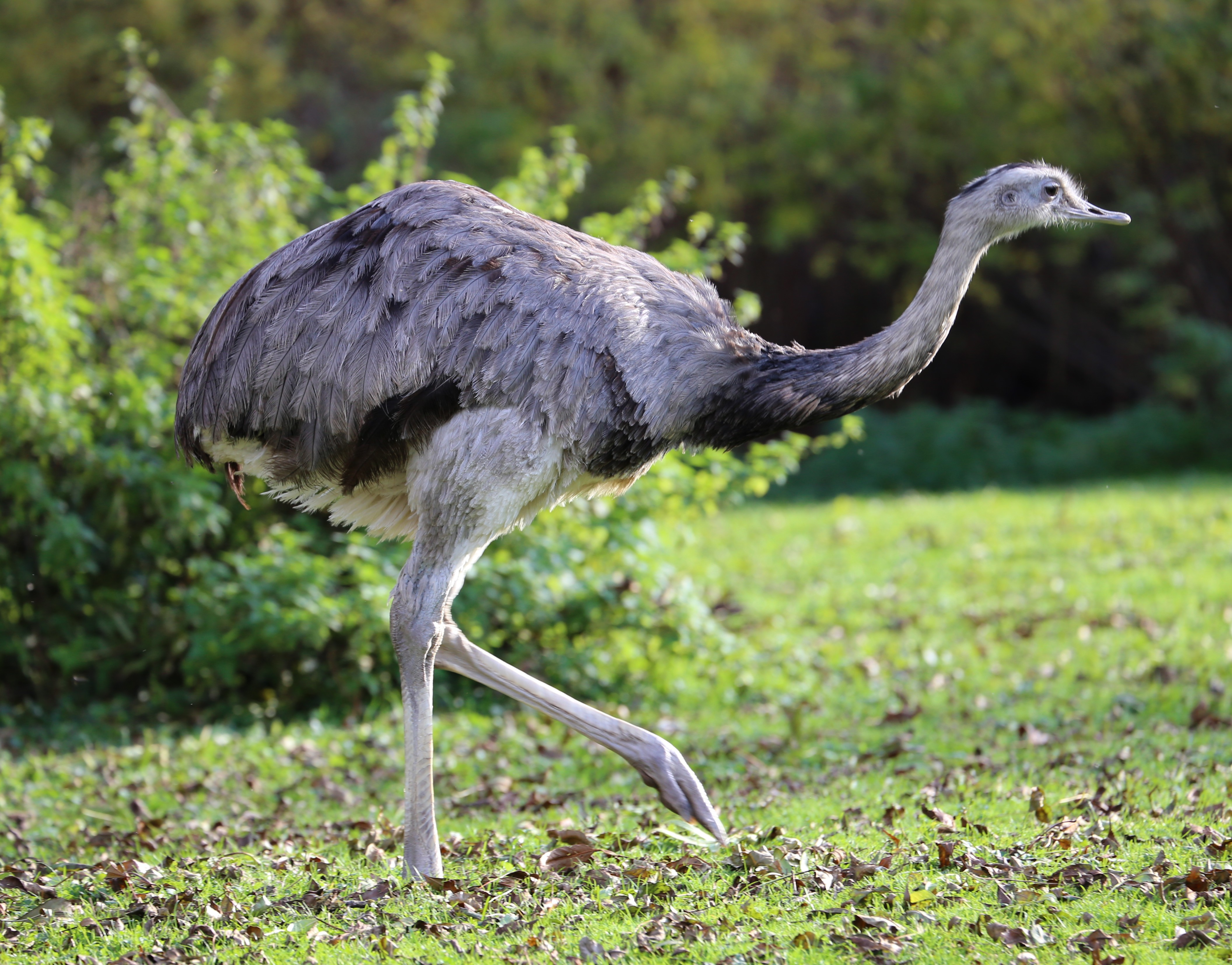
- Greater rhea (Rhea americana) in Tierpark Hellabrunn, Munich, Germany

Conservation status
- Near Threatened (IUCN 3.1)
- CITES Appendix II

Scientific classification
- Kingdom: Animalia
- Phylum: Chordata
- Class: Aves
- Infraclass: Palaeognathae
- Order: Rheiformes
- Family: Rheidae
- Genus: Rhea
- Species: R. americana

Binomial name
- Rhea americana (Linnaeus, 1758)

Subspecies
- R. a. albescens (Lynch & Holmberg, 1878); R. a. americana (Linnaeus, 1758); R. a. araneipes Brodkorb, 1938; R. a. intermedia Rothschild & Chubb, 1914; R. a. nobilis Brodkorb, 1939
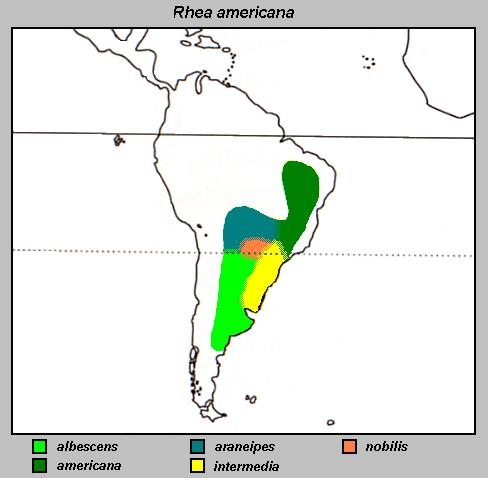
- Distribution of subspecies

Synonyms
- List: Struthio americanus Linnaeus, 1758; Struthio rhea Linnaeus, 1766; Rhea nandua Temminck, 1823; Rhea nandu Lesson, 1828; Rhea macrorhyncha Sclater, 1860; Rhea albescens Lynch & Holmberg, 1878; Rhea americana albinea Döring, 1881; Rhea rothschildi Brabourne & Chubb, 1911; Rhea americana rothschildi Brabourne & Chubb, 1911

= Greater rhea =

Species of flightless South American bird

The greater rhea (Rhea americana) is a species of flightless bird native to eastern South America. Other names for the greater rhea include the grey, common, or American rhea; ema (Portuguese); or ñandú (Guaraní and Spanish). One of two species in the genus Rhea, in the family Rheidae, it inhabits a variety of open areas, such as grasslands, savanna or grassy wetlands. Weighing 20–27 kilograms (44–60 lb), the greater rhea is the largest native bird in the Americas. In the wild, the greater rhea has a life expectancy of 10.5 years. It is also notable for its reproductive habits, and for the fact that a population has established itself in Northern Germany in the 2000s and 2010s. The species is listed as Near Threatened by the IUCN.

== Taxonomy ==
The common name and genus name is from Rhea, a Greek goddess and mother of six Olympians. The greater rhea was formally described in 1758 by the Swedish naturalist Carl Linnaeus in the tenth edition of his Systema Naturae. He placed it with the ostriches in the genus Struthio and coined the binomial name Struthio americanus. Linnaeus based his account on the "Nhanduguaçú" that had been described in 1648 by the German naturalist Georg Marcgrave in his book Historia Naturalis Brasiliae. Linnaeus designated the type locality as South America but this has been restricted to the states of Sergipe and Rio Grande do Norte in eastern Brazil based on Marcgrave. The greater rhea is now placed in the genus Rhea that was introduced in 1760 by the French zoologist Mathurin Jacques Brisson.

This species is placed in the family Rheidae, and the order Rheiformes. It closely related to other ratites such as emus, ostriches, cassowaries, and kiwi, along with the extinct forms: moa and elephant birds.

=== Subspecies ===
There are five subspecies of the greater rhea; their ranges meet around the Tropic of Capricorn:

Image	Subspecies	Distribution
	R. a. americana	campos of northern and eastern Brazil
	R. a. intermedia	Uruguay and extreme southeastern Brazil (Rio Grande do Sul state)
	R. a. nobilis	eastern Paraguay, east of Rio Paraguay
	R. a. araneipes	chaco of Paraguay and Bolivia and the Mato Grosso state of Brazil
	R. a. albescens	plains of Argentina south to the Rio Negro province

Main subspecific differences are the extent of the black coloring of the throat and the height. However, subspecies of the greater rhea differ so little across their range that, without knowledge of the place of origin, it is essentially impossible to identify captive birds by subspecies.

== Description ==
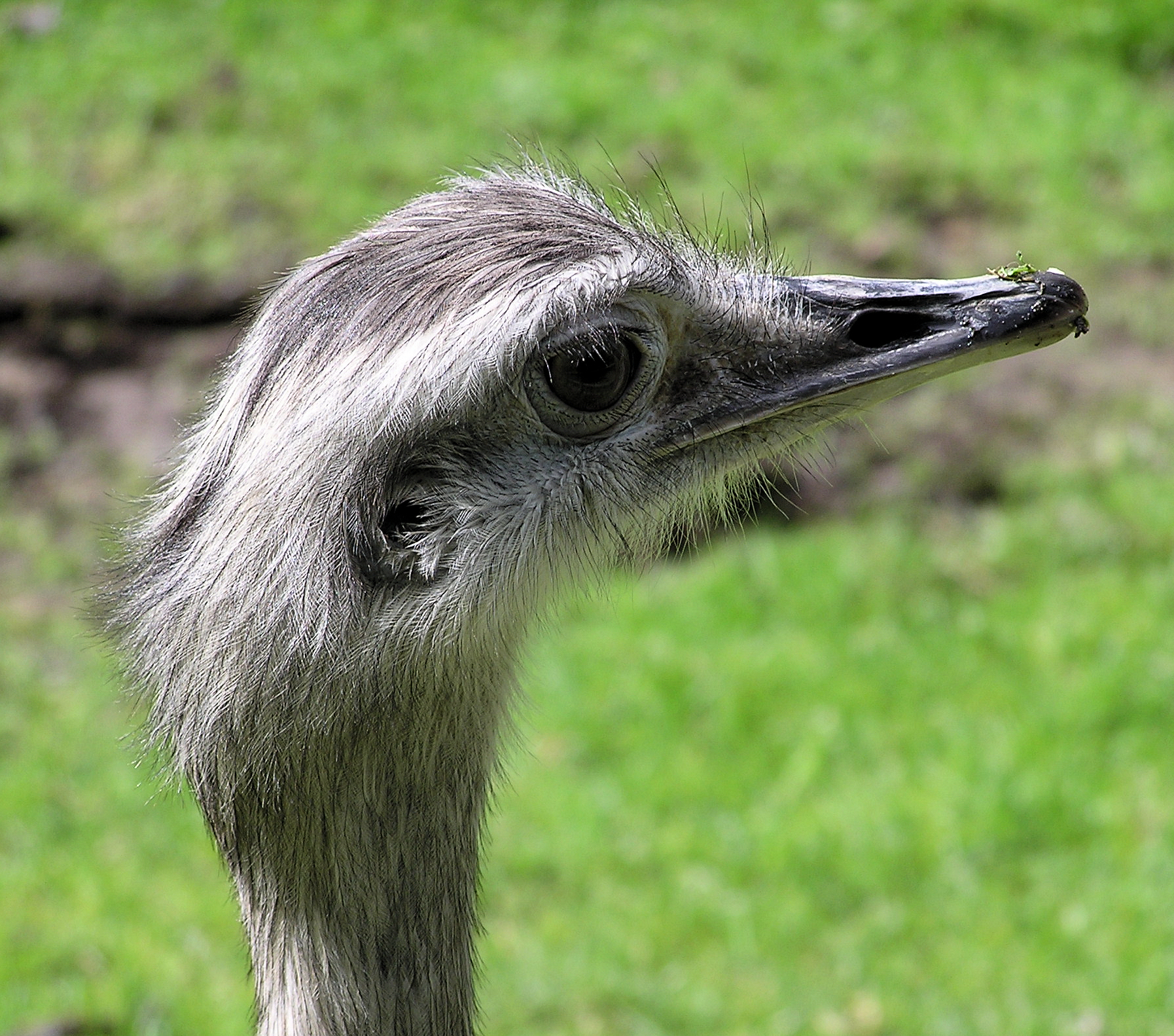
Greater rhea, closeup, Cricket St Thomas Wildlife Park (Somerset, England)

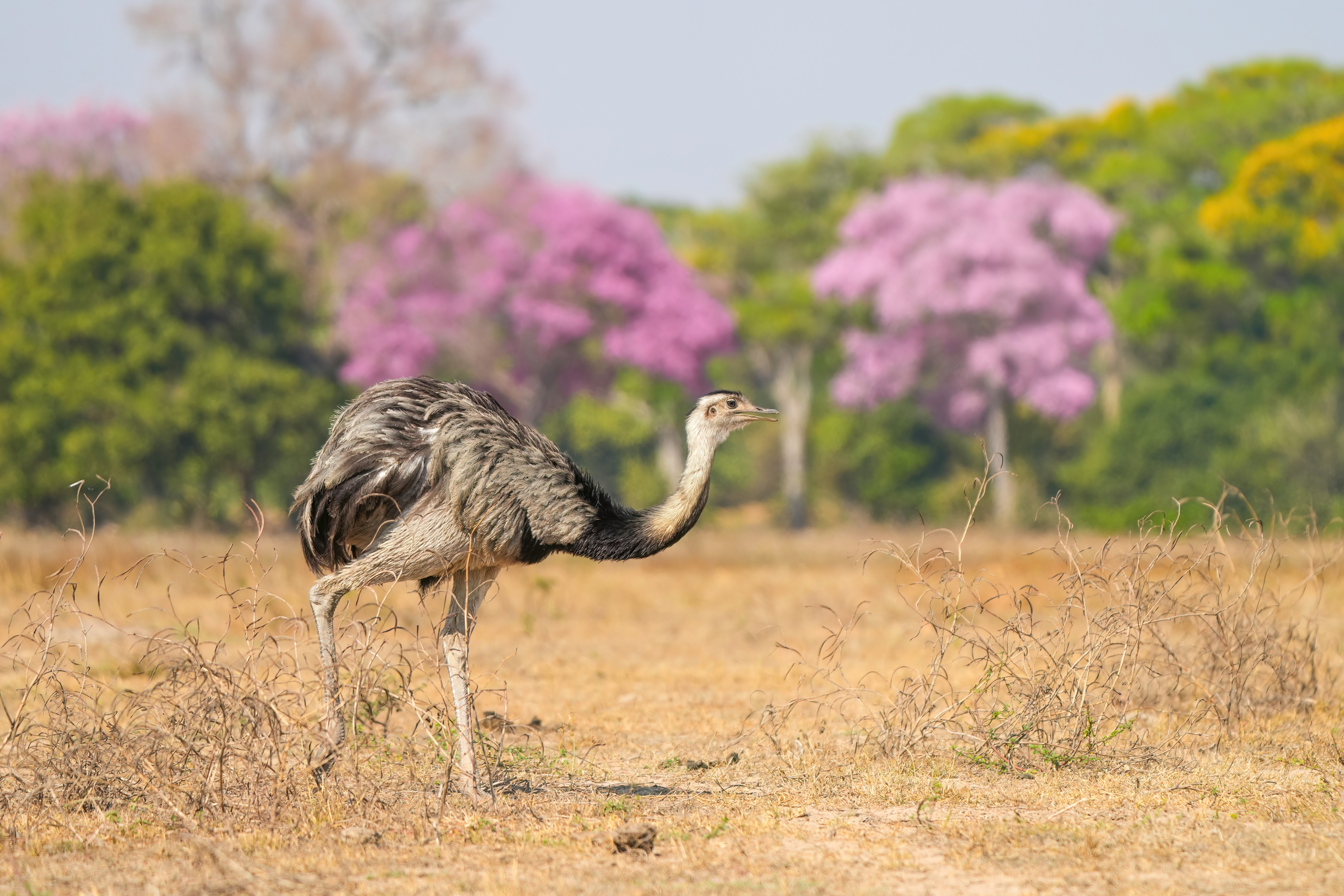
Greater rhea in Mato Grosso, Brazil

The adults have an average weight of 20–27 kg (44–60 lb) and often measure 127 to 140 cm (50 to 55 in) long from beak to tail; they usually stand about 1.5 m (4 ft 11 in) tall, with a typical range of 1.4 to 1.7 m (4 ft 7 in to 5 ft 7 in), to the top of the head. The males are generally bigger than the females. Despite the delineation of this species as the "greater rhea" versus the lesser rhea, some data on body masses indicates that both species average about 23 kg (51 lb) in weight, but even at mass parity that greater species appears larger and is taller due to its longer legs and neck, whereas the lesser rhea is more compact and more so resembles an outsized, long-necked turkey in build. Elsewhere, the lesser rhea has been cited with a lower average weight of 16 kg (35 lb). In some areas, male greater rheas weights of up to 35 kg (77 lb) are not uncommon and even females of up to 32 kg (71 lb) have been weighed, both weights higher than the maximum known mass for the lesser rhea. Large males can weigh up to 40 kg (88 lb), stand nearly 1.83 m (6.0 ft) tall and measure over 150 cm (59 in) long, although this is uncommon.

The greater rhea has cursorial locomotion, being adapted for high speed movement. While the lesser rhea is faster, the greater rhea has superior stamina. In one instance, an individual ran over 60 km/h (37 mph) in front of a car.

The head and bill are fairly small, the latter measuring 8–10.4 cm (3.1–4.1 in) in length. The legs are long, with the tarsus measuring between 33.5 and 37 cm (13.2 and 14.6 in), and strong and have 22 horizontal plates on the front of the tarsus. They have three toes, and the hind toe is absent. The wings of the American rhea are rather long; the birds use them during running to maintain balance during tight turns, and also during courtship displays.

Greater rheas have a fluffy, tattered-looking plumage, that is gray or brown, with high individual variation, The head, neck, rump, and thighs are feathered. In general, males are darker than females. Even in the wild—particularly in Argentina—leucistic individuals (with white body plumage and blue eyes) as well as albinos occur. Hatchling greater rheas are grey with dark lengthwise stripes.

== Distribution and habitat ==
The greater rhea is native to Argentina, Bolivia, Brazil, Paraguay, and Uruguay. There are also feral populations of the greater rhea in Germany. This species inhabits grassland dominated by satintail (Imperata) and bahiagrass (Paspalum) species, as well as savanna, scrub forest, chaparral, and even desert and palustrine lands, though it prefers areas with at least some tall vegetation. It is absent from the humid tropical forests of the Mata Atlântica and planalto uplands along the coast of Brazil and extends south to 40° latitude. They prefer lower elevations and seldom go above 1,200 metres (3,900 ft). During the breeding season (spring and summer), it stays near water.

A small non-indigenous population of the greater rhea established itself in Germany. One male and five females escaped from a farm in Groß Grönau, Schleswig-Holstein, in August 2000. These birds survived the winter and succeeded in breeding in a habitat sufficiently similar to their native South American range. They eventually crossed the Wakenitz river and settled in Nordwestmecklenburg in the area around and particularly to the north of Thandorf village. A biosurvey conducted in late 2012 found the population had grown to more than 100 and was settling in permanently. In early 2017 the population reached about 220 birds. As local farmers suffered harvest losses due to the birds, some farmers were granted an allowance to destroy the eggs of the birds to stop the population from growing further. At the end of 2017 a population of about 250 birds was estimated. They are regarded as "domestic" and thus protected from hunting. In the autumn of 2018, the German population grew to 566 individuals, and hunting of the birds was allowed; additionally, the population was reduced by destroying eggs during breeding season.

== Behavior and ecology ==
=== Individual and flock behavior ===
The greater rhea is a silent bird except during mating season, when they make low booming noises, and as chicks, when they give a mournful whistle. During the non-breeding season they will form flocks of between 10 and 100 birds. When in flocks, they tend to be less vigilant, but the males can get aggressive towards other males. When chased they will flee in a zigzag pattern, alternately raising one wing then the other. These flocks break up in the winter in time for breeding season.

=== Feeding and diet ===
Birds of the species, drinking water in the World of Birds, Cape Town, RSA

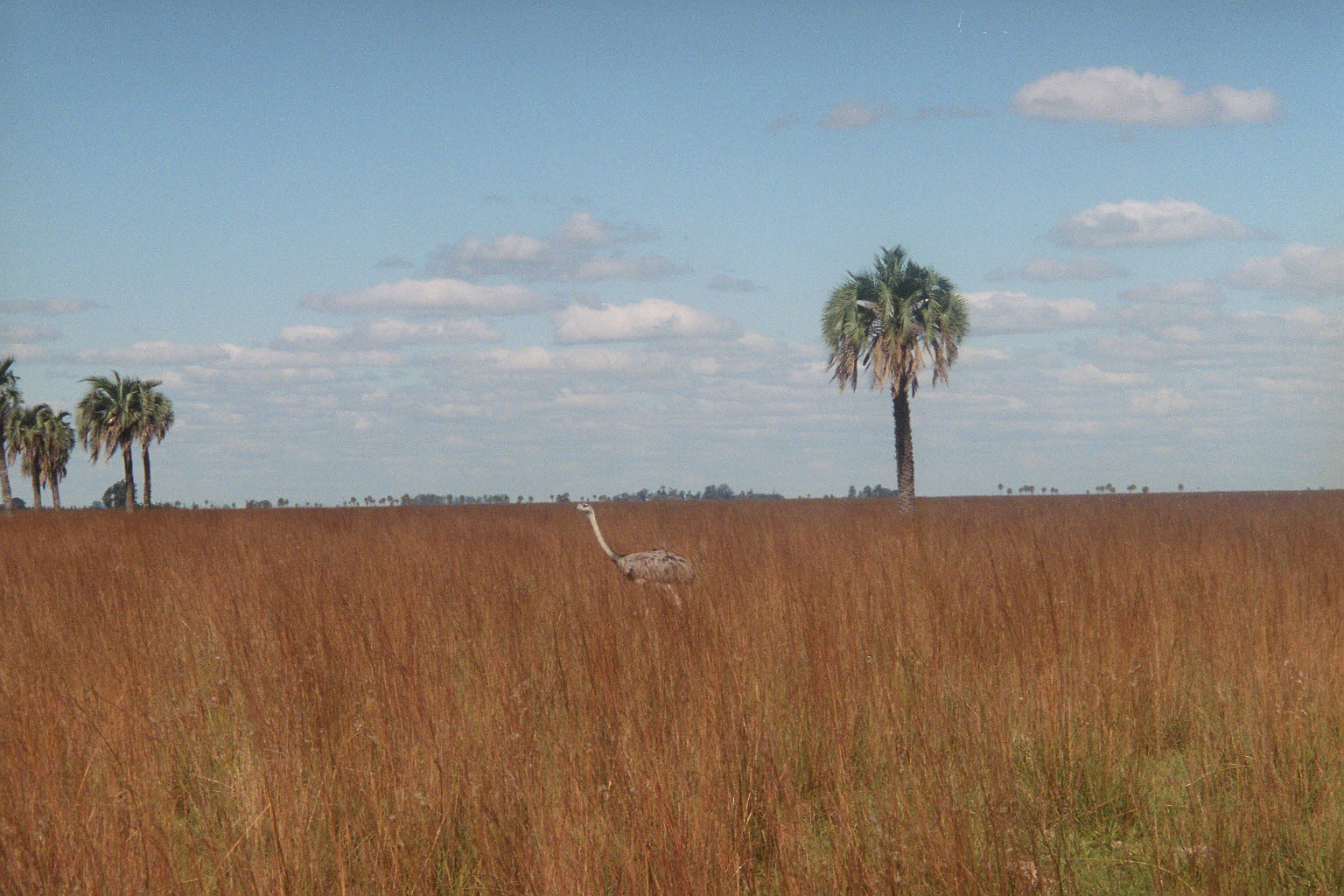
Wild greater rhea (probably R. a. albescens) in habitat, Goya Department, Corrientes Province, Argentina

The rhea's diet mainly consists of broad-leaved foliage, particularly seed and fruit when in season, but also insects, scorpions, fish, small rodents, reptiles, and small birds. Favorite food plants include native and introduced species from all sorts of dicot families, such as Amaranthaceae, Asteraceae, Bignoniaceae, Brassicaceae, Fabaceae, Lamiaceae, Myrtaceae or Solanaceae. Magnoliidae fruit, for example of Duguetia furfuracea (Annonaceae) or avocados (Persea americana, Lauraceae) can be seasonally important.

They do not usually eat cereal grains, or monocots in general. However, the leaves of particular grass species like Brachiaria brizantha can be eaten in large quantities, and broad-leaved plants (e.g. the sarsaparilla Smilax brasiliensis) have also been recorded as foodplants. Even tough and spiny vegetable matter like tubers or thistles is eaten with relish.

Like many birds which feed on tough plant matter, the greater rhea swallows pebbles which help grind down the food for easy digestion. It is much attracted to sparkling objects and sometimes accidentally swallows metallic or glossy objects. Rheas are also coprophagous and occasionally consume fresh fecal matter of other rheas.

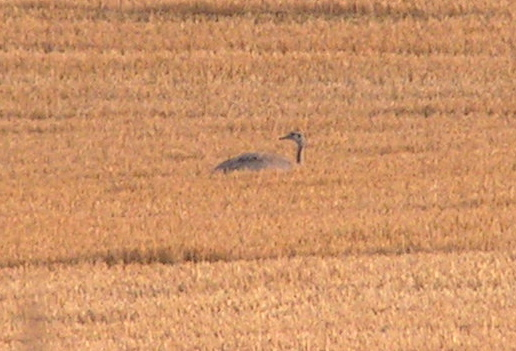
Feral greater rhea in cereal field in Mecklenburg-Vorpommern, Germany. The species normally uses such monocultures to hide rather than to feed on the plants.

In fields and plantations of plants they do not like to eat, e.g., cereals or eucalyptus, the greater rhea can be a species quite beneficial to farmers. It will eat any large invertebrate it can catch; its food includes locusts and grasshoppers, true bugs, cockroaches, and other pest insects. Juveniles eat more animal matter than adults. In mixed cerrado and agricultural land in Minas Gerais (Brazil), R. a. americana was noted to be particularly fond of beetles. It is not clear whether this applies to the species in general but for example in pampas habitat, beetle consumption is probably lower simply due to availability while Orthoptera might be more important.

The greater rhea is able to eat Hymenoptera in quantity. These insects contain among them many who can give painful stings, though the birds do not seem to mind. Sometimes, greater rheas will gather at carrion to feed on flies; they are also known to eat dead or dying fish in the dry season, but as vertebrate prey in general not in large quantities.

=== Reproduction ===
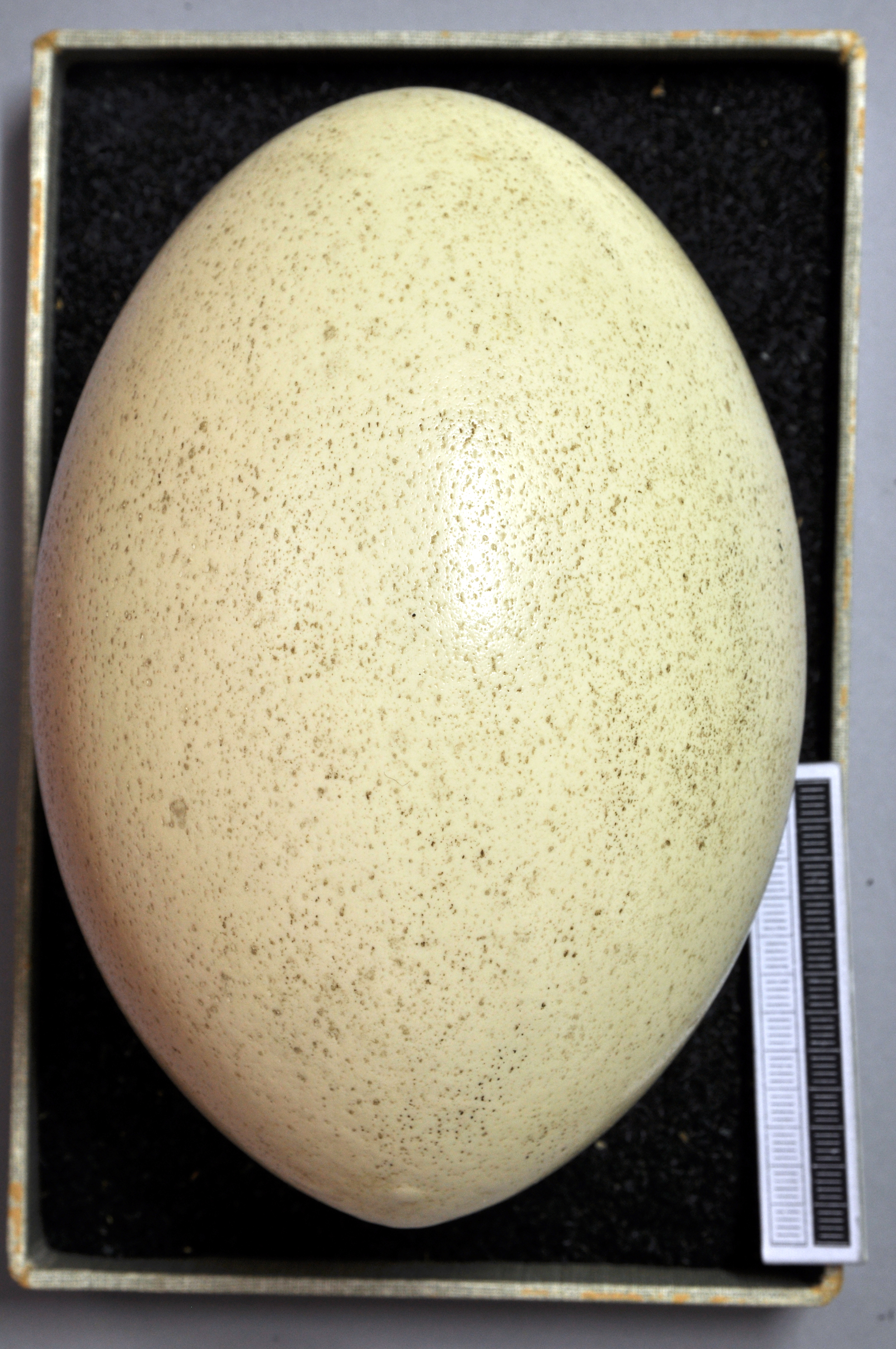
Egg, Collection Museum Wiesbaden, Germany

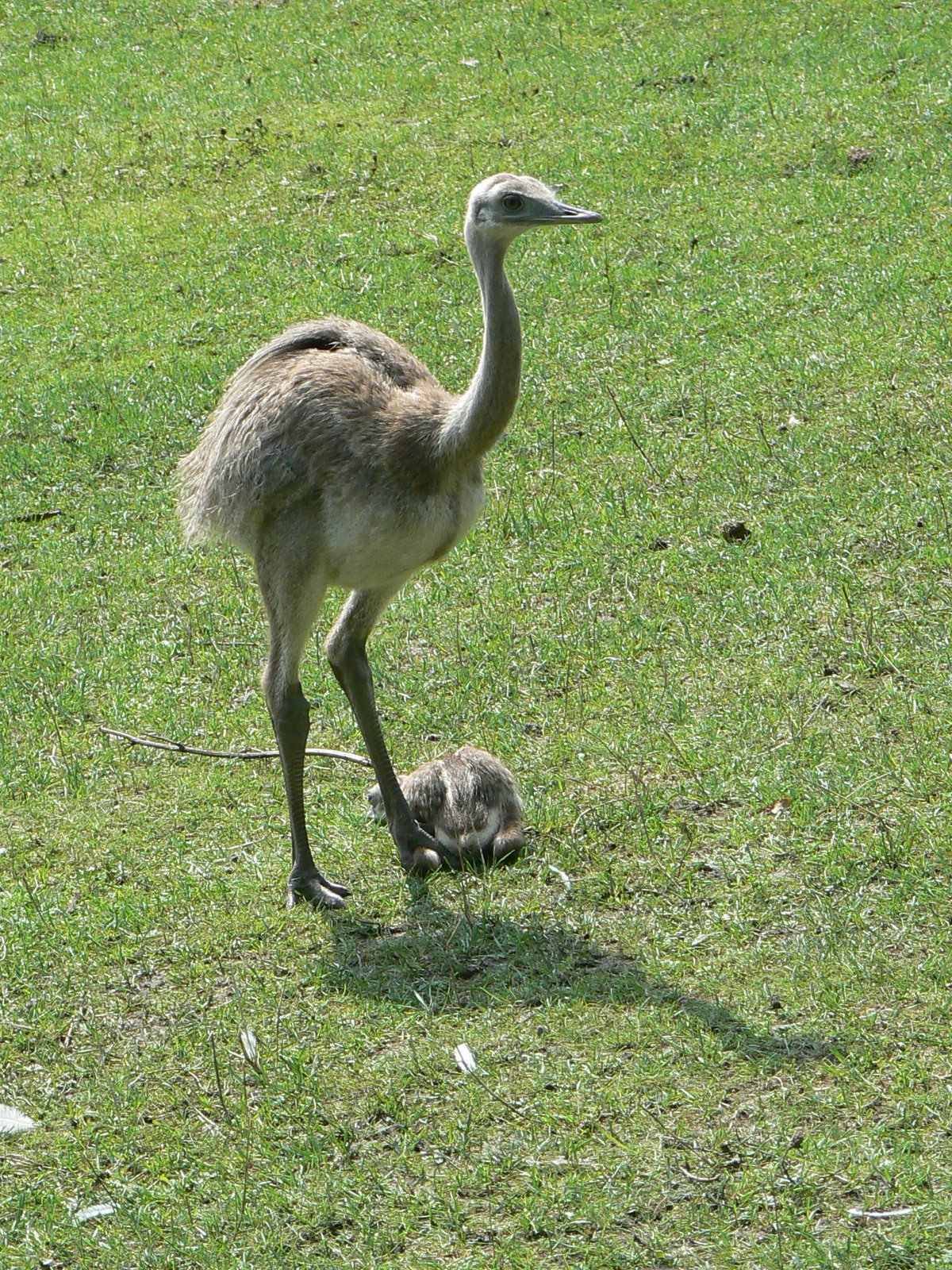
Two-month-old greater rhea in Tierpark Hagenbeck with hatchling at its feet

After the large flocks break up in the winter, they form into three loose groups:

- single males,
- flocks of between two and fifteen females, and
- a large flock of yearlings.

As winter approaches, males become more aggressive towards each other. Then they start courting females by calling and raising the front of their body up while keeping their neck straight and ruffling their plumage. They will raise their wings and may run some distance like this, sometime flapping their wings methodically. After doing this and attracting females, they will continue calling at a specific female, and will start to either walk alongside her or in front of her while spreading their wings and lowering their head. As the display continues, the male rhea will get more intense and animated and start waving his neck around and in figure eights. Once he has attracted a first mate he will copulate with her and then lead her to his nest.

When it is time for the eggs to be laid, the male will typically be on his nest already and act aggressively when approached by the female, covering the nest with his wings. He will gradually relax and allow her to crouch and lay the egg at the edge of the nest. The male will roll the egg into his nest.

Males are simultaneously polygynous, females are serially polyandrous. In practice, this means that the females move around during breeding season, mating with a male and depositing their eggs with the male before leaving him and mating with another male. Males on the other hand are sedentary, attending the nests and taking care of incubation and the hatchlings all on their own. Recent evidence has shown that some males will utilize subordinate males to help incubate and protect the eggs. If this happens, the dominant male will find a second harem and start the process over again. The nests are thus collectively used by several females and can contain as many as 80 eggs laid by a dozen females; each individual female's clutch numbers some 5–10 eggs. However, the average clutch size is 26 eggs laid by seven different females.

Rhea eggs measure about 130 mm × 90 mm (5.1 in × 3.5 in) and weigh around 600 g (21 oz) on average; they are thus less than half the size of an ostrich egg. Their shell is greenish-yellow when fresh but soon fades to dull cream when exposed to light. The nest is a simple shallow and wide scrape in a hidden location; males will drag sticks, grass, and leaves in the area surrounding the nest so it resembles a firebreak as wide as their neck can reach. The incubation period is 29–43 days. All the eggs hatch within 36 hours of each other even though the eggs in one nest were laid perhaps as much as two weeks apart. Hatching eggs emit a strong smell which attracts flies, which the hatchlings feed on. Greater rheas reach sexual maturity at 2–3 years of age.

=== Predators ===
The natural predators of adult greater rheas are limited to the cougar (Puma concolor), which are found in most areas inhabited by greater rheas and are certain to be their leading predator, and the jaguar (Panthera onca), which are found with greater rheas and opportunistically hunt them in the Paraguayan chaco, central Bolivia and the Brazilian cerrado. Feral dogs are known to kill younger birds, and the crested caracara (Caracara plancus) is suspected to prey on hatchlings. Armadillos sometimes feed on greater rhea eggs; nests have been found which had been undermined by a six-banded armadillo (Euphractus sexcinctus) or a big hairy armadillo (Chaetophractus villosus) and the rhea eggs were broken apart. Predation on young rheas has also been reportedly committed by greater grisons (Galictis vittata).

Captive-bred greater rheas exhibit significant ecological naïveté. This fearlessness renders them highly vulnerable to predators if the birds are released into the wild in reintroduction projects. Classical conditioning of greater rhea juveniles against predator models can prevent this to some degree, but the personality type of the birds – whether they are bold or shy – influences the success of such training. In 2006, a protocol was established for training greater rheas to avoid would-be predators, and for identifying the most cautious animals for release.

== Status and conservation ==
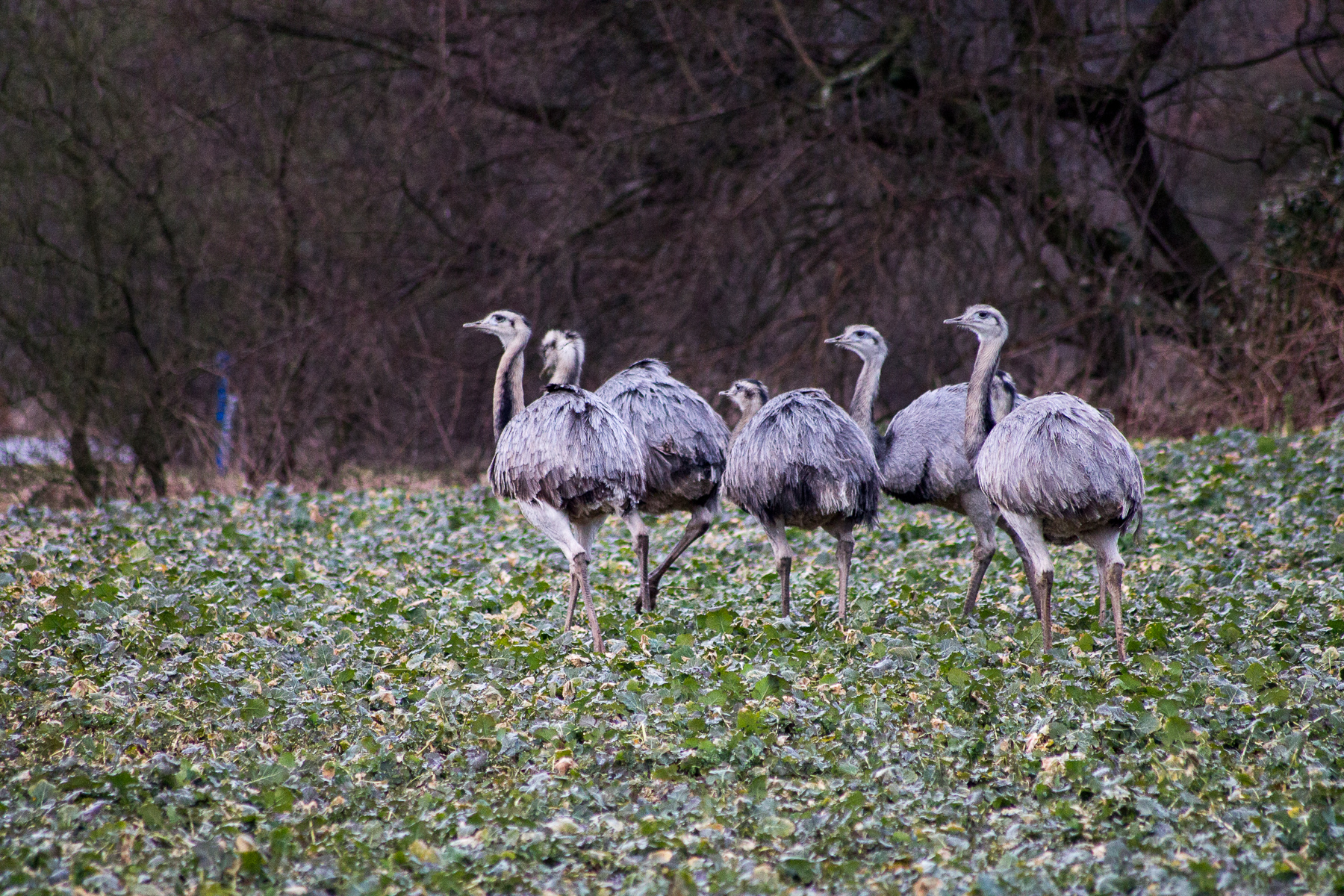
A flock in Lenschow, Mecklenburg-Vorpommern

The greater rhea is considered a Near Threatened species according to the IUCN, and they have a decreasing range of about 6,540,000 square kilometres (2,530,000 sq mi). The species is believed to be declining due to increased hunting and the conversion of central South American grasslands to farmland and ranchland. The populations of Argentina and Uruguay are most seriously affected by the decline.

Farmers sometimes consider the greater rhea pests, because they will eat broad-leaved crop plants, such as cabbage, chard and bok choy. Where they occur as pests, farmers tend to hunt and kill greater rheas. The burning of crops in South America has also contributed to their decline.

International trade in wild-caught greater rheas is restricted as per CITES Appendix II.

The rheas in Germany are legally protected in a similar way to native species. In its new home, the greater rhea is considered generally beneficial as its browsing helps maintain the habitat diversity of the sparsely populated grasslands bordering the Schaalsee biosphere reserve. They are however considered as a threat to local farmers and described as an invasive species since 2015 according to the NHBS. German authorities have issued 'alternatives' to culling the birds which still sparks controversy.

== Relationship with humans ==
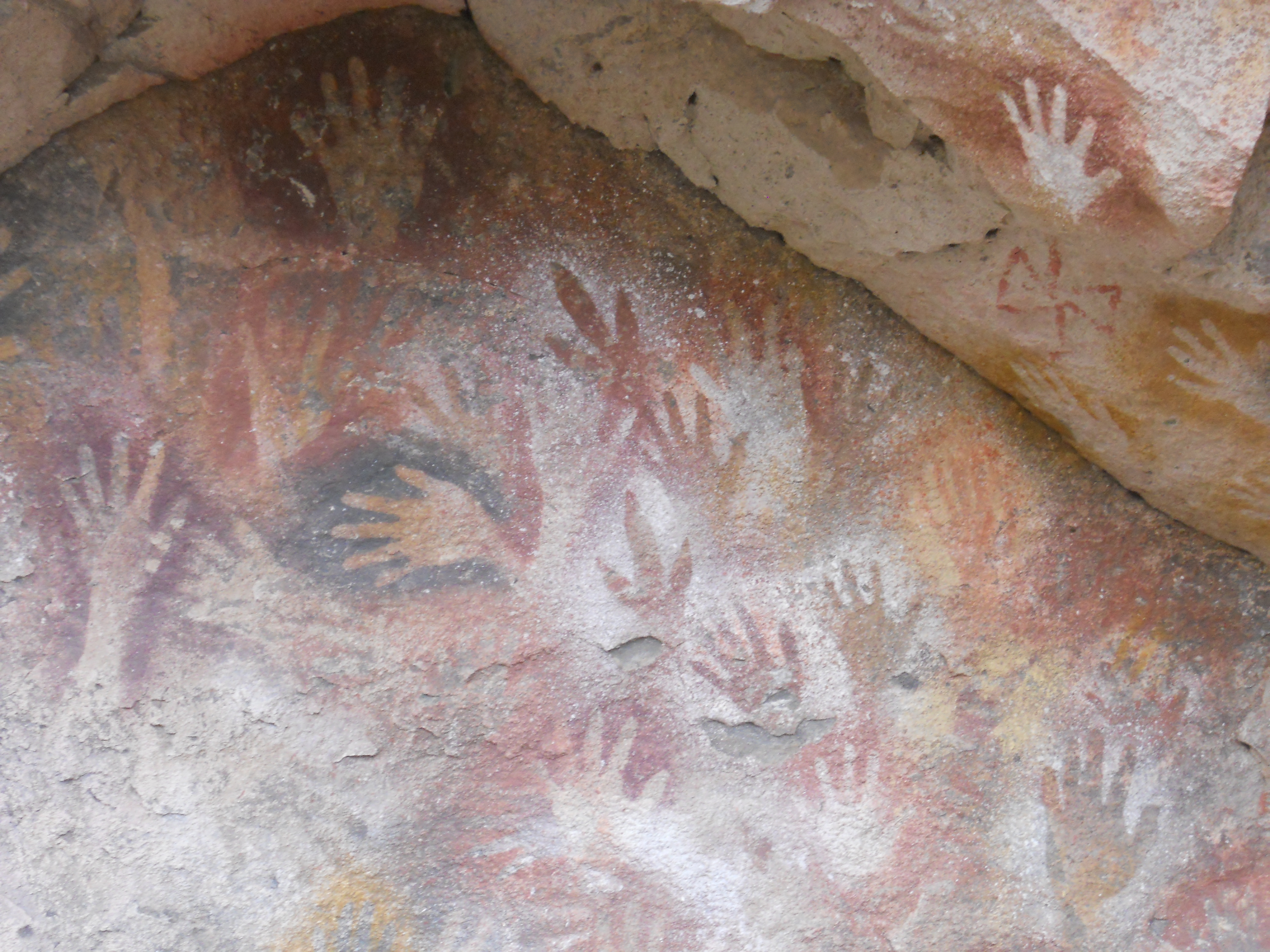
Rhea feet next to human hands

Ancient humans in the Patagonia region used to hunt greater rhea, and stencils of greater rhea feet dating back to the early Holocene can be found at rock art sites such as Cueva de las Manos.

The species is farmed in North America and Europe in a similar fashion to other ratites, such as the emu and ostrich. The main products are meat and eggs, but rhea oil is used for cosmetics and soaps, and rhea leather is also traded in quantity. Male greater rheas are very territorial during the breeding season. The infant chicks have high mortality in typical confinement farming situations, but under optimum free-range conditions chicks will reach adult size by their fifth month.
