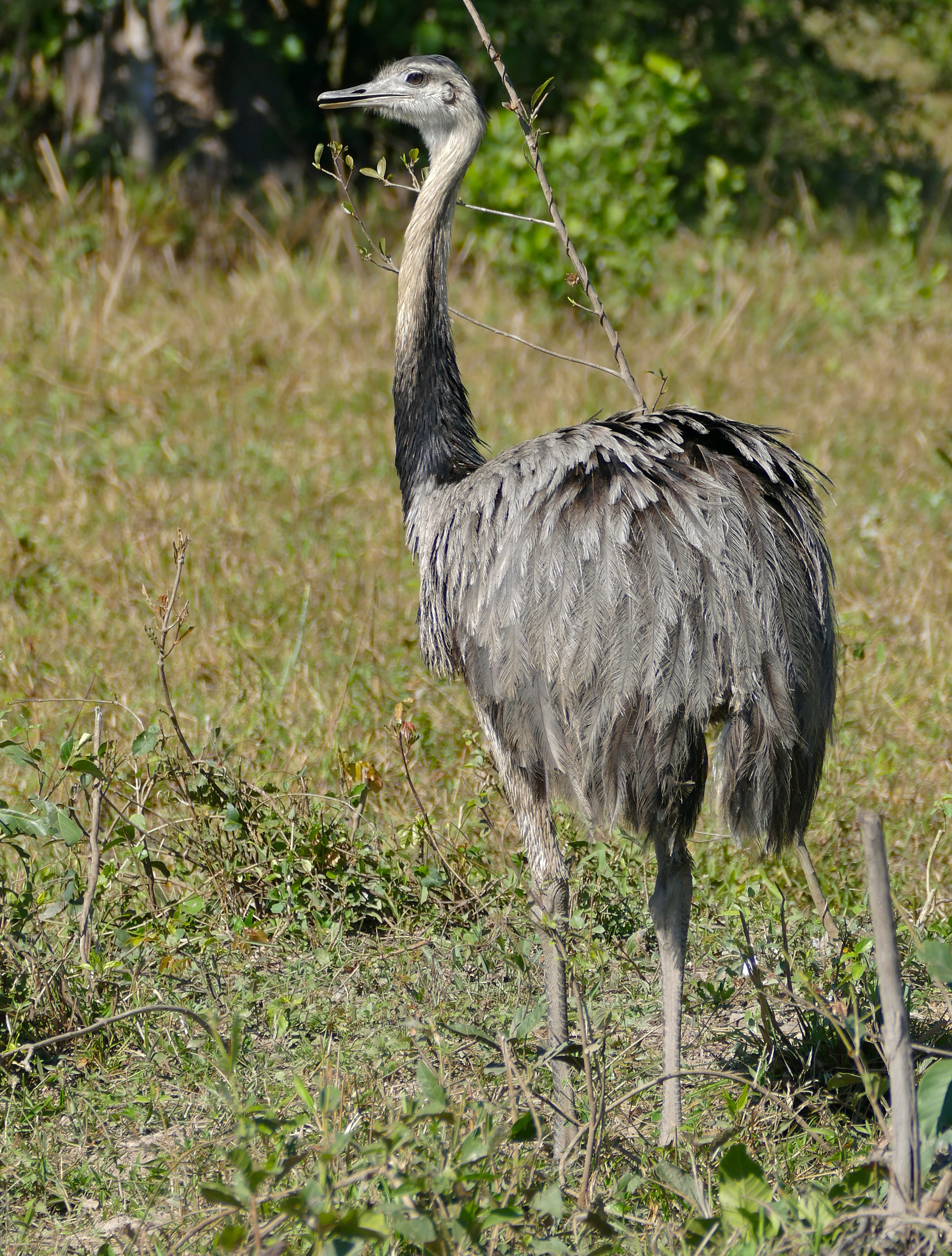
- Greater rhea (Rhea americana)

Scientific classification
- Kingdom: Animalia
- Phylum: Chordata
- Class: Aves
- Infraclass: Palaeognathae
- Clade: Notopalaeognathae
- Order: Rheiformes; Forbes, 1884

Subgroups
- Rheidae Bonaparte, 1849; ?†Diogenornis Alvarenga, 1983; †Heterorhea Rovereto, 1914; †Hinasuri Tambussi, 1995; †Opisthodactylus Ameghino, 1891; Rhea Brisson, 1760

= Rheiformes =

Rheiformes Temporal range: Eocene – Holocene, 40–0 Ma

Order of birds

Rheiformes is an order that contains the family Rheidae (rheas). It is in the infraclass Paleognathae, which contains all ratites. Extant members are found in South America. While the IOC World Bird List and the Clements Checklist categorise Rheiformes as its own order, the BirdLife Data Zone includes rheas, along with ostriches, tinamous, cassowaries, emu, and kiwis, in the order Struthioniformes. Of the two extant species of rheas recognized by the IUCN Red List, as of 2022, Rhea americana is listed as near threatened, while Rhea pennata is listed as least concern. From 2014 to 2022, the IUCN recognised Rhea tarapacensis as a separate species, and listed it as near threatened in its last assessment in 2020; in 2022, it was again recognised as a subspecies of R. pennata.

Today, the order is represented by the sole living genus Rhea, though it contains 4-5 genera in total depending on the affiliation of the extinct genus Diogenornis. The taxonomy of the order is as follows:

Order Rheiformes (Forbes, 1884) Furbringer, 1888 [Rheimorphae Bonaparte, 1849; Rheae Forbes 1884]

- Family Rheidae (Bonaparte 1849) Bonaparte, 1853
  - ? Genus †Diogenornis de Alvarenga 1983 (Late Paleocene) – possibly a member of Casuariiformes instead.
  - Genus †Heterorhea Rovereto 1914 (Pliocene)
  - Genus †Hinasuri Tambussi 1995 (Miocene-Pliocene)
  - Genus †Opisthodactylus Ameghino 1895 (Miocene)
  - Genus Rhea Brisson 1760 (Miocene-Recent)

== Extant species summary ==
The IOC World Bird List (version 15.1) recognizes 2 species of Rheiformes. As of January 2026, IUCN/BirdLife International have assessed both species within the order, but neither have a global population estimate.

Common name	Binomial name	Population	Status	Trend	Notes	Image
Greater rhea	Rhea americana	unknown	NT	▼		
Lesser rhea (Darwin's rhea)	Rhea pennata	unknown	LC	▼	The populations of subspecies R. p. tarapacensis and R. p. garleppi are estimated to total 1,000-2,499 mature individuals. The population of the nominate subspecies, R. p. pennata, is expected to be much larger but has not been quantified.	
