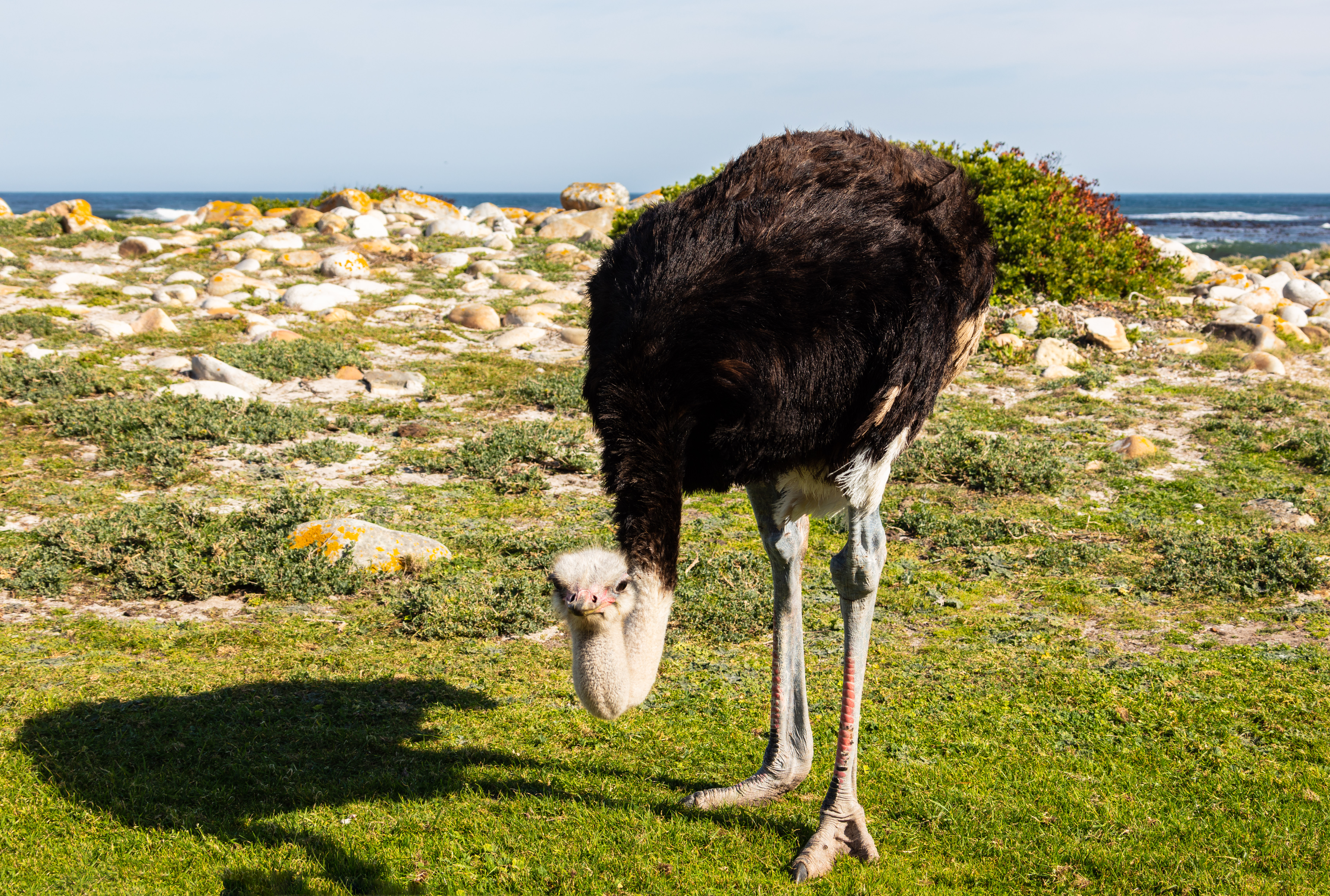
- Male at Cape of Good Hope, South Africa
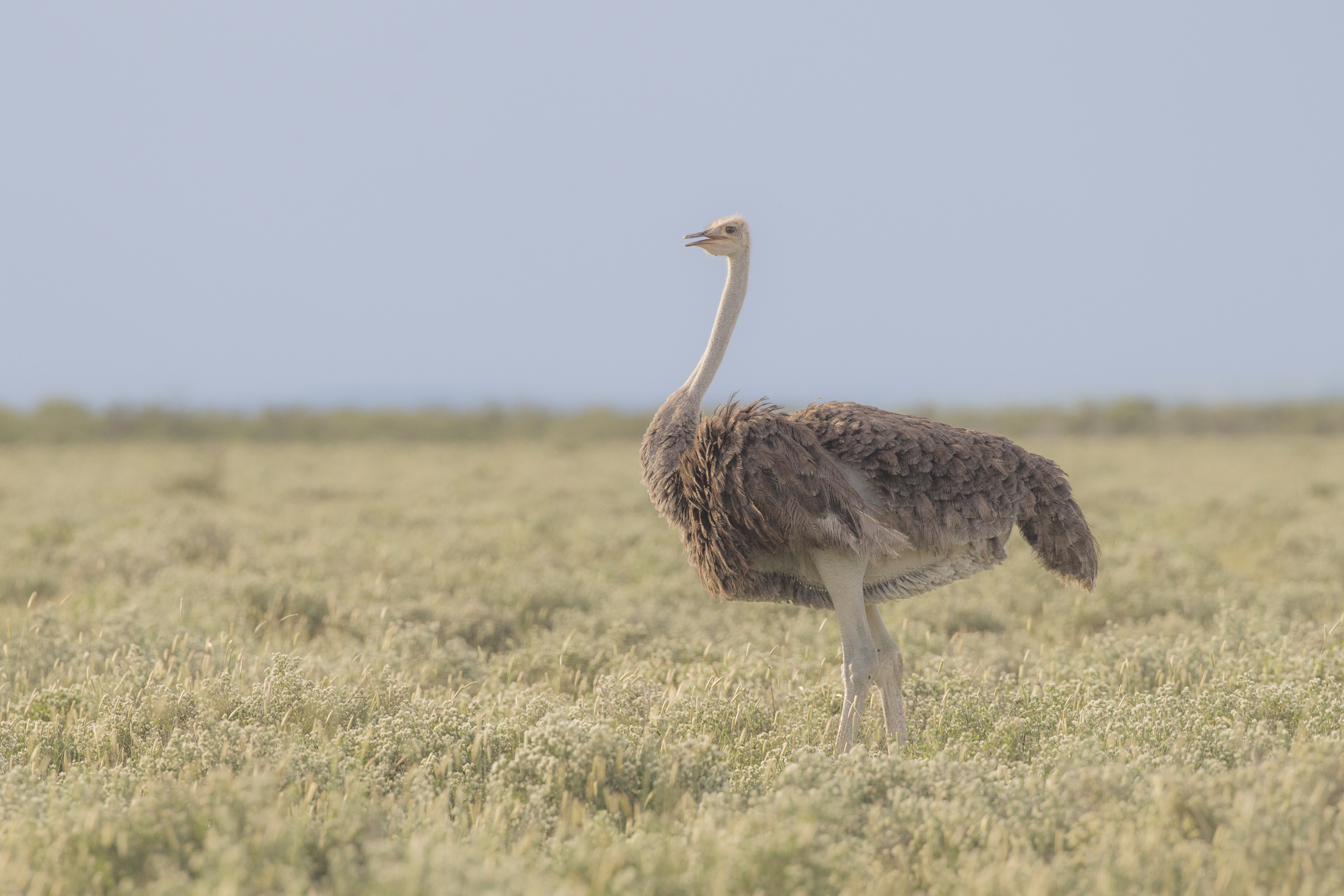
- Female at Etosha National Park, Namibia

Scientific classification
- Kingdom: Animalia
- Phylum: Chordata
- Class: Aves
- Infraclass: Palaeognathae
- Order: Struthioniformes
- Family: Struthionidae
- Genus: Struthio
- Species: S. camelus
- Subspecies: S. c. australis

Trinomial name
- Struthio camelus australis (Gurney, 1868)
Struthio camelus distribution map
South African subspecies (S. c. australis)

= South African ostrich =

Subspecies of bird

The South African ostrich (Struthio camelus australis), also known as the black-necked ostrich, Cape ostrich or southern ostrich is a subspecies of the common ostrich endemic to Southern Africa. It is widely farmed for its meat, eggs and feathers.

== Description ==
The South African ostrich is a large flightless bird with long, bare legs and neck, a thick body, and a small head. It has grey-colored legs and neck. The ostrich is a didactyl species, meaning each foot has two toes, both ending in a sharp claw. It stands at a height of 1.2–2 m (3.9–6.6 ft) tall and weighs between 60 and 80 kg (130 and 180 lb).

There is sexual dimorphism between males and females. Males have mostly black feathers covering their body, except for the tips of the primary feathers and rectrices, which are white. The male's tail feathers are often stained a chestnut colour. Females and immature individuals have almost entirely grey-brown feathers covering their body. Juveniles have tan/dark brown banded plumage. They possess a similar appearance as a small long-legged gamebird.

== Taxonomy ==
In 1868, Gurney came up with the name Struthio australis for the South African ostrich. The full scientific name is Struthio camelus australis. The name Struthio signifies "ostrich", camelus stands for "camel", and australis means "southern". The South African ostrich is a subspecies of the common ostrich ( Struthio camelus). Other subspecies of the common ostrich include the North African ostrich (Struthio camelus camelus), Masai ostrich (Struthio camelus massaicus), and the Arabian ostrich (Struthio camelus syriacus). The Somali ostrich (Struthio molybdophanes) is the other modern species of ostrich.

The South African ostrich belongs to the group of flightless birds known as ratites, which are part of the taxonomic group Palaeognathae. The living ratites include five orders: kiwis, cassowaries, emus, rheas and ostriches.

== Habitat and distribution ==
=== Habitat ===
South African ostriches are often found in semi-arid and arid environments, such as savannas, deserts, and open plains, which provide ample space for running and foraging. These nomadic birds tend to travel in groups, known as flocks. Their flocks typically consist of a dominant male, several females, and their chicks.

=== Distribution ===
Most common ostriches in South Africa were partly derived from the Somali ostrich as domesticated hybrids bred for the feather industry. Today, the South African ostrich is found in South Africa, Namibia, Malawi, Zambia, Zimbabwe, Angola and Botswana. It lives in south of the rivers Zambezi and Cunene. The subspecies ranges from southern and southwestern Angola east to Zimbabwe and Botswana, southern Mozambique, and south to western and northern South Africa. It was formerly found throughout Zambia and was once more widespread across South Africa. They have been introduced in Eswatini and not present in Lesotho.

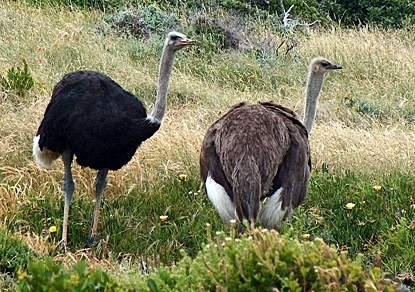
Male and female South African ostriches.

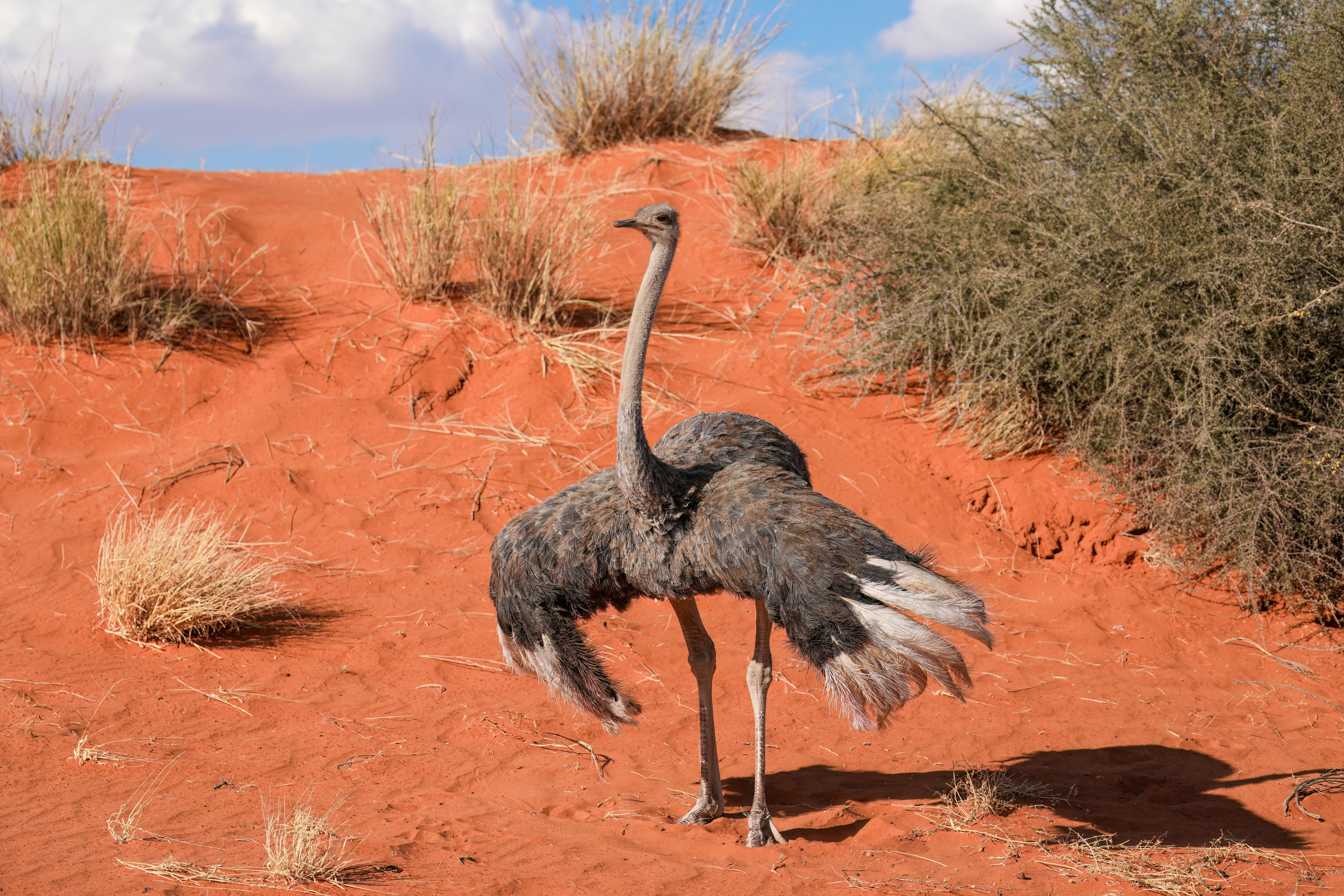
Immature South African ostrich in the Kalahari Desert of Namibia

== Threats ==
It is farmed for its eggs, meat, leather and feathers in the Little Karoo area of Cape Province.

== Feral population ==
Feral South African ostriches roam the Australian outback after having escaped from farms in the 20th century. The extent of their range in Australia is not known.

== Behaviour ==
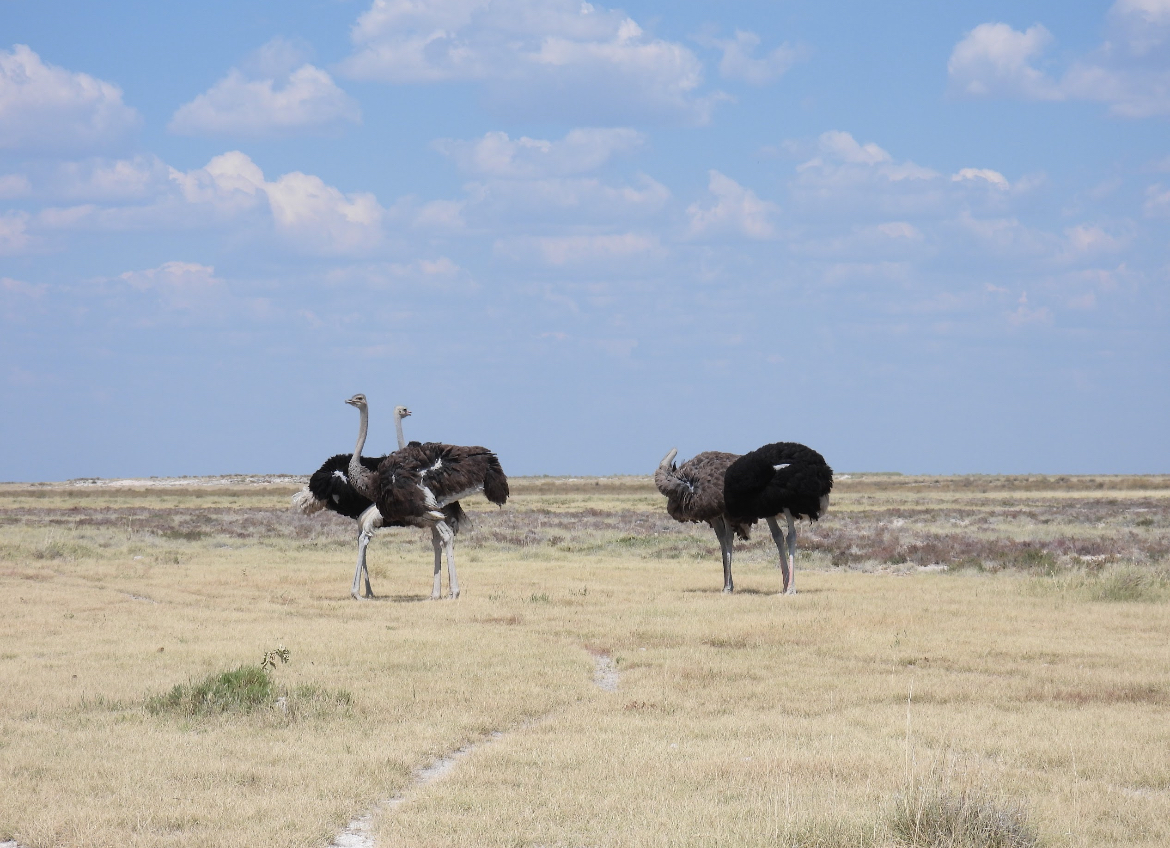
Two South African ostrich couples located in Etosha National Park, Namibia

The South African ostrich comes across as a timid, calm yet vigilant when around other groups of mammals and birds. They try to avoid other species only frequenting the same areas when necessary, such as for food and water. In the presence of oryx, kudu, Burchell's zebra and springbok the South African ostrich often remained impartial. This species is described as jumpy, seen many times fleeing from harmless animals after the smallest disruption. During the dry season, a flock of ostriches may be composed of individuals with varying sexes and ages. Water holes act as social gathering sites. Young males, females and families regularly pass through from many different areas. These meetings will create a temporary social spot.

A commensalistic relationship is often brief and formed through a random encounter and not from any deliberate actions. In 1969, Sauer observed ostriches directing their tension from another species, towards a flock member. The ostrich is very capable of defending itself. With strong legs, the ostrich can administer powerful kicks. When given the choice, they would prefer to quickly run away. After fleeing from danger, the ostrich will hastily find their flock members.

=== Vocalizations ===
The South African ostrich emits a variety of sounds described as booming or lion-like. Similar to the reproductive stance, the male ostrich will stand tall and make "booming" calls to assert his dominance or deter predators from the young. He can make a wide range of threatening calls which sound almost like a snort, hiss or low boo. The "boo boo boohoo'hoo" as described in Sauer & Sauer (1966) is a vocalization heard on nest sites during the pre-copulatory courtship. Once a nesting site is established the male makes similar "booming" calls directed towards rivals in their territory. The ostrich will be heard more often calling in the early morning and late afternoon, sometimes until midnight or late into the night.

=== Diet ===
The South African ostrich is a herbivorous species adapted for eating several different food items. They eat grass and forage on trees and bushes. Ostriches do not have a crop, meaning the food passes from the esophagus to the stomach. They do not develop any teeth. They are able to break up their food using their gizzard. The gizzard has a few small pebbles which will help grind the food.

=== Reproduction ===
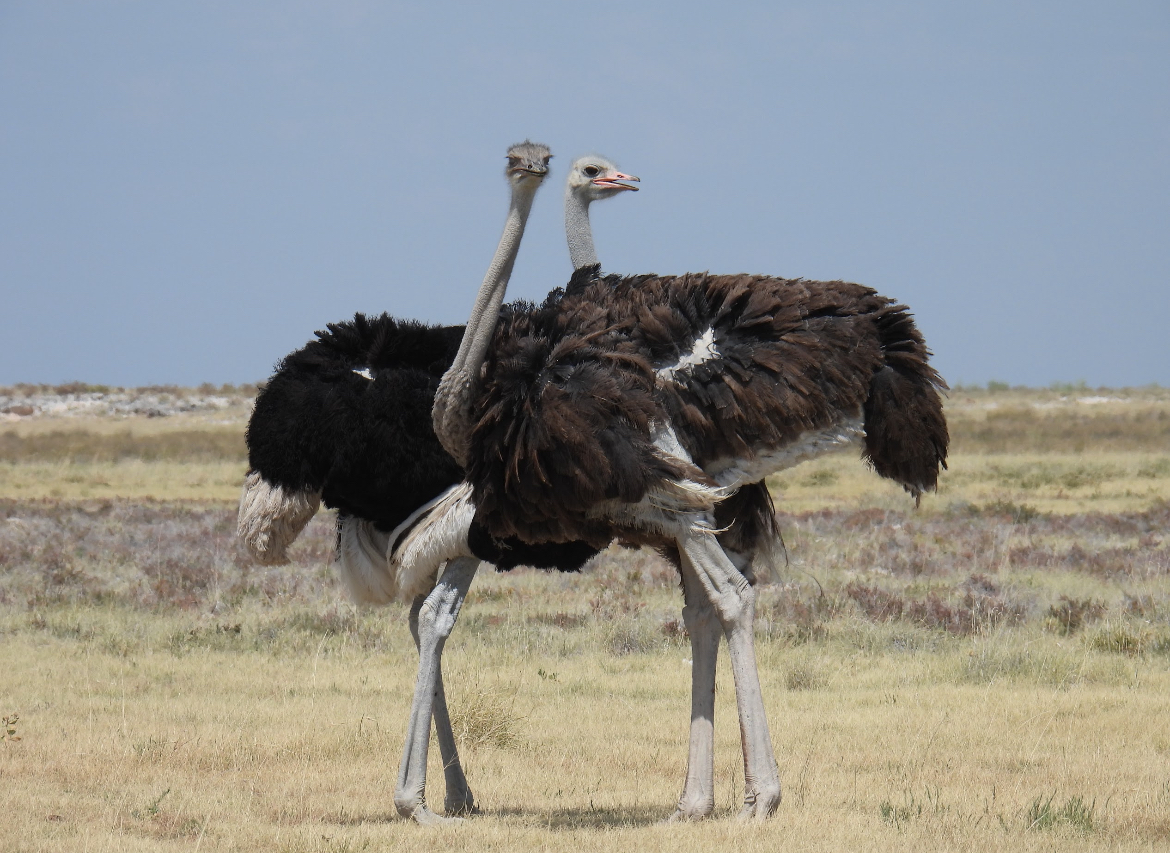
South African ostrich couple located in Etosha National Park, Namibia

Nearing the end of the dry season. The female South African ostrich will signal her fitness to a potential mate by performing a courtship dance or display. To attract a male, the female may even produce feces and urinate. The female will even chase off other females from her potential partner's territory.

As the males approach the reproductively ready female, their face, neck and shins turn red. The males perform a dance or ceremonial rivalries in front of the females to get their attention. He kneels down, moving his head and wings from side to side. The male will chase the females while standing tall, almost on "tippy toes" and display quick tiny steps while his neck and wings are pointed upwards. Dominant males will remain erect and vocalize to passing by males. They are capable of keeping this position for many hours without eating.

Nests are chosen by the male or by the breeding individuals. Most commonly, they will form polygamous units composed of one cock and three hens, with one taking on a more dominant role (major hen). The South African ostrich chooses a nest site away from communal grounds and watering holes. They construct a nest in dry sandy locations by pushing the sediment. These nests average three meters in diameter. The "major hen" will start laying first, followed by the "minor hens" who starts laying after the "major hen" lays her second egg. This synchronized process of laying eggs lasts 11 days. During this time the male guards the nest.

In one study, the South African ostrich laid a clutch of eight eggs maximum. The "minor hens" laid three or four eggs. The weight of these eggs ranged from 1,221 to 1,752 g (43.1 to 61.8 oz) with the average being 1,346 g (47.5 oz). The length of the eggs measured 12.2 to 15.6 cm (4.8 to 6.1 in) and the width ranged from 11.2 to 13.0 cm (4.4 to 5.1 in), with an average length and width of 14.3 and 12.1 cm (5.6 and 4.8 in), respectively. When the incubation period starts, the male and females will rotate the task of sitting on the eggs. The ideal temperature for ostrich egg incubation falls within 35 to 36 °C (95 to 97 °F) and the relative humidity is between 40% and 42%.

== Status and conservation ==
This subspecies of ostrich found in the wild is scarce. Most populations are located on reserves and wilderness areas.
