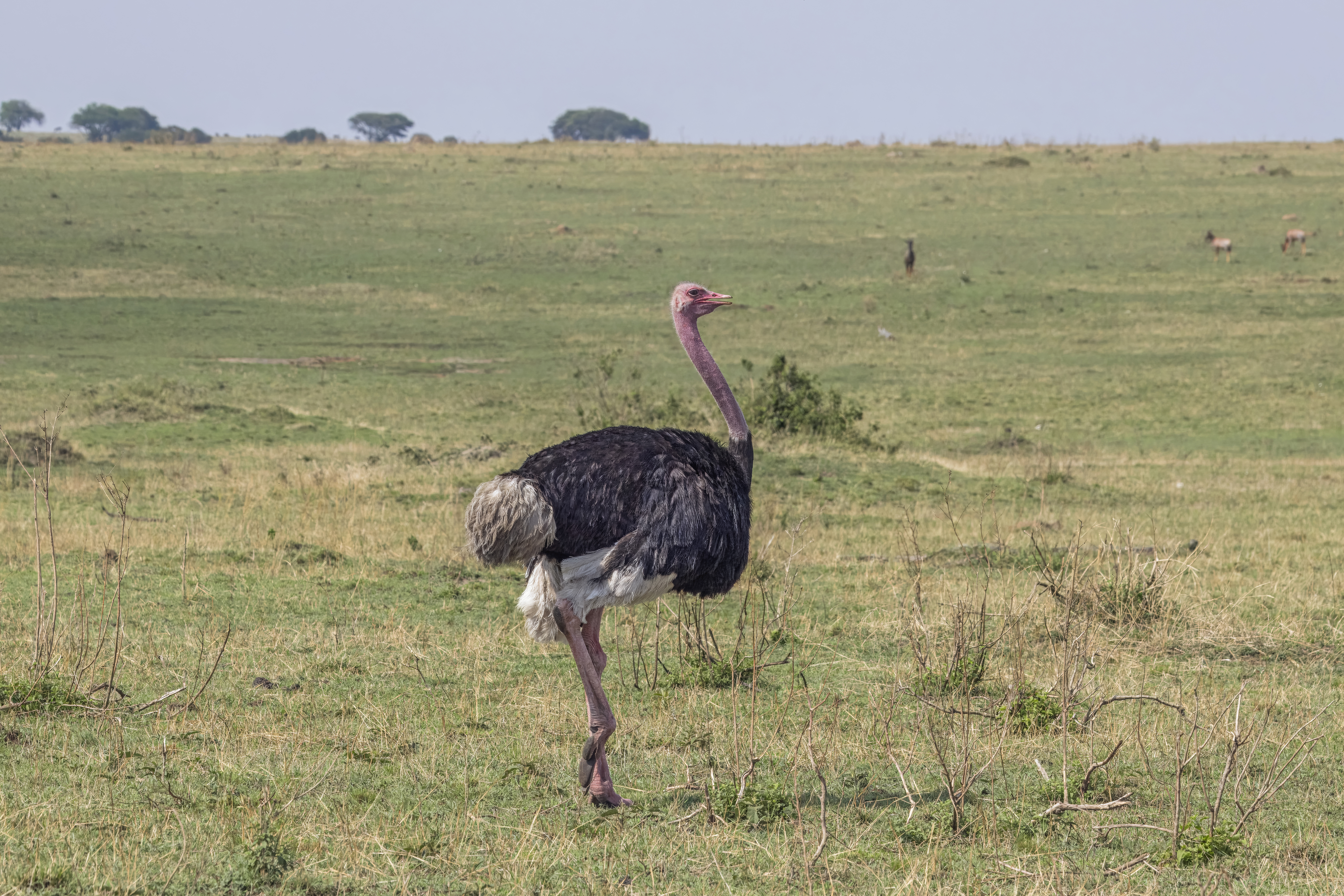
- Male
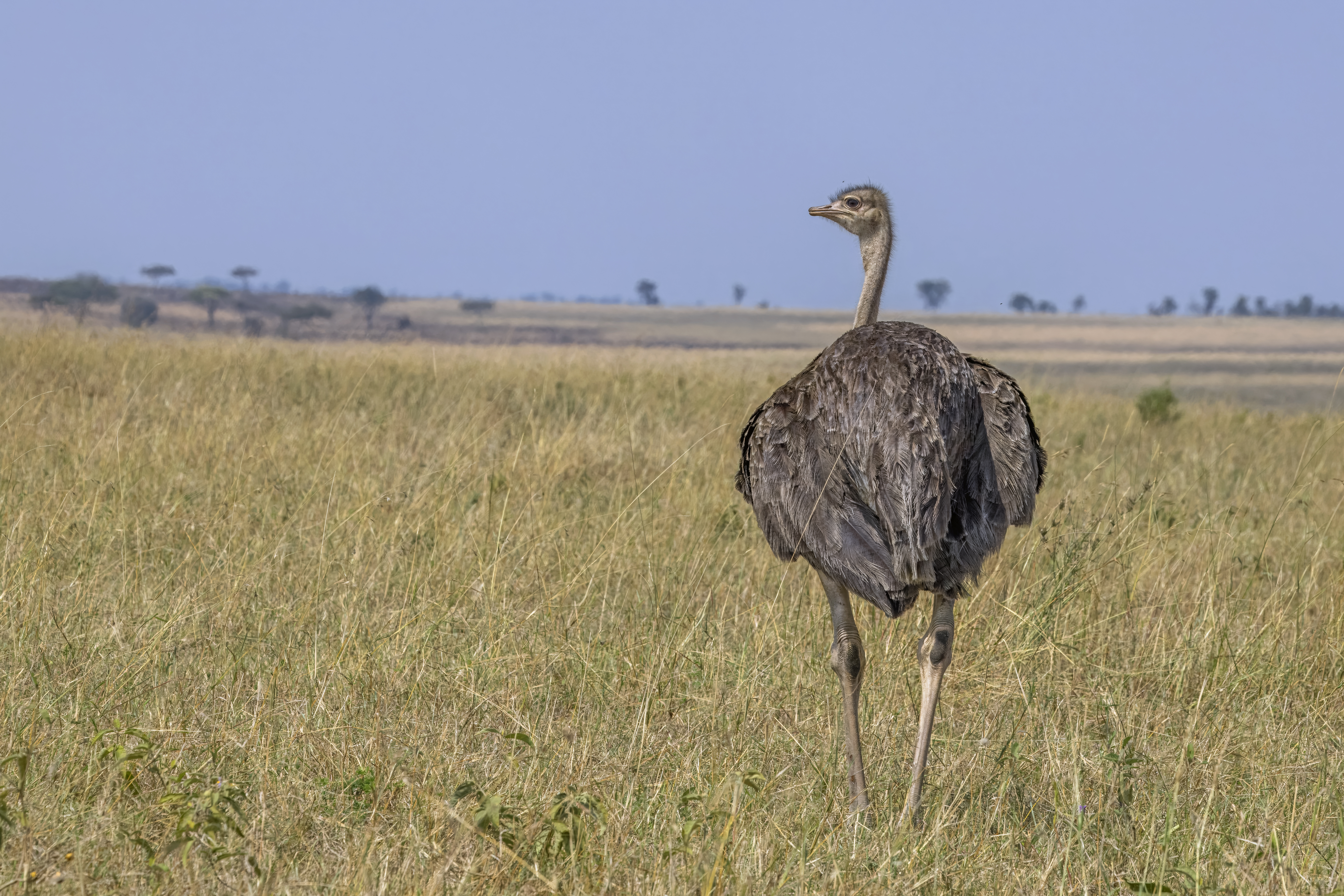
- Female both in Serengeti National Park, Tanzania

Conservation status
- Least Concern (IUCN 3.1)

Scientific classification
- Kingdom: Animalia
- Phylum: Chordata
- Class: Aves
- Infraclass: Palaeognathae
- Order: Struthioniformes
- Family: Struthionidae
- Genus: Struthio
- Species: S. camelus
- Subspecies: S. c. massaicus

Trinomial name
- Struthio camelus massaicus (Neumann, 1898)
Struthio camelus distribution map
Masai subspecies (S. c. massaicus)

= Masai ostrich =

Subspecies of bird

The Masai ostrich (Struthio camelus massaicus), also known as the East African ostrich, is a red-necked subspecies variety of the common ostrich and is endemic to East Africa. It is one of the largest birds in the world, second only to its sister subspecies Struthio camelus camelus. Today it is farmed for eggs, meat, and feathers.

== Taxonomy ==
=== Subspecies ===
The Masai ostrich is one of the three extant subspecies of ostrich currently inhabiting Africa, including the nominative ostrich (S. c. camelus) found across northern Africa and the South African ostrich (S. c. australis). It is considered one of the two red-necked forms of ostrich, along with S. c. camelus, as opposed to the two blue-necked forms (S. c. australis and S. c. molybdyphanes).

Comparative restriction-enzyme analysis of mitochondrial DNA (mtDNA) found the Masai ostrich, though genetically distinct, is most closely related to S. c. australis, despite their geographical separation, and least genetically related to S. c. molybdophanes, despite habitat overlap. Explanations for these counterintuitive findings are that while the Brachystegia or “miombo” woodlands currently serves as a zoogeographic barrier separating northern and southern ostrich populations, it is theorized that this barrier was not as dense and effective throughout evolutionary time and once allowed for brief periods of intraspecific breeding between S. c. massaicus and S. c. australis populations. Conversely, the genetic divergence observed between S. c. massaicus and S. c. molybdophanes, albeit a lack of any zoogeographic barrier, is thought to be due to the ecological differences in behavioral and reproductive cues between these populations. These differences were substantial enough to prevent intraspecific breeding throughout time. These same studies found S. c. massaicus to significantly differ genetically from S. c. camelus subspecies.

Although the now extinct subspecies S. c. syriacus was determined to also be a red-necked form of ostrich based on historical evidence, similar analysis of mtDNA found the Masai ostrich to not be as close of a relative to S. c. syriacus compared to S. c. camelus.

== Description ==
=== Anatomy ===
Adult males are 2.1–2.7 m in height and can weigh up to 145 kg; females are typically slightly smaller in size. They have large eyes (50 mm across), long eyelashes, and exceptional vision. Their heads are relatively small compared to their body and are covered in degenerated feathers that give the upper two-thirds of their elongated neck an almost naked appearance. The skin of the neck and thighs of male Masai ostriches is bare and pink in color, which intensifies to an almost reddish hue during mating season.

Their large size prevents the capability of flight, but this is compensated by their exceptionally long and muscular legs, which allow for maximum running speeds of up to 60–70 km/h.

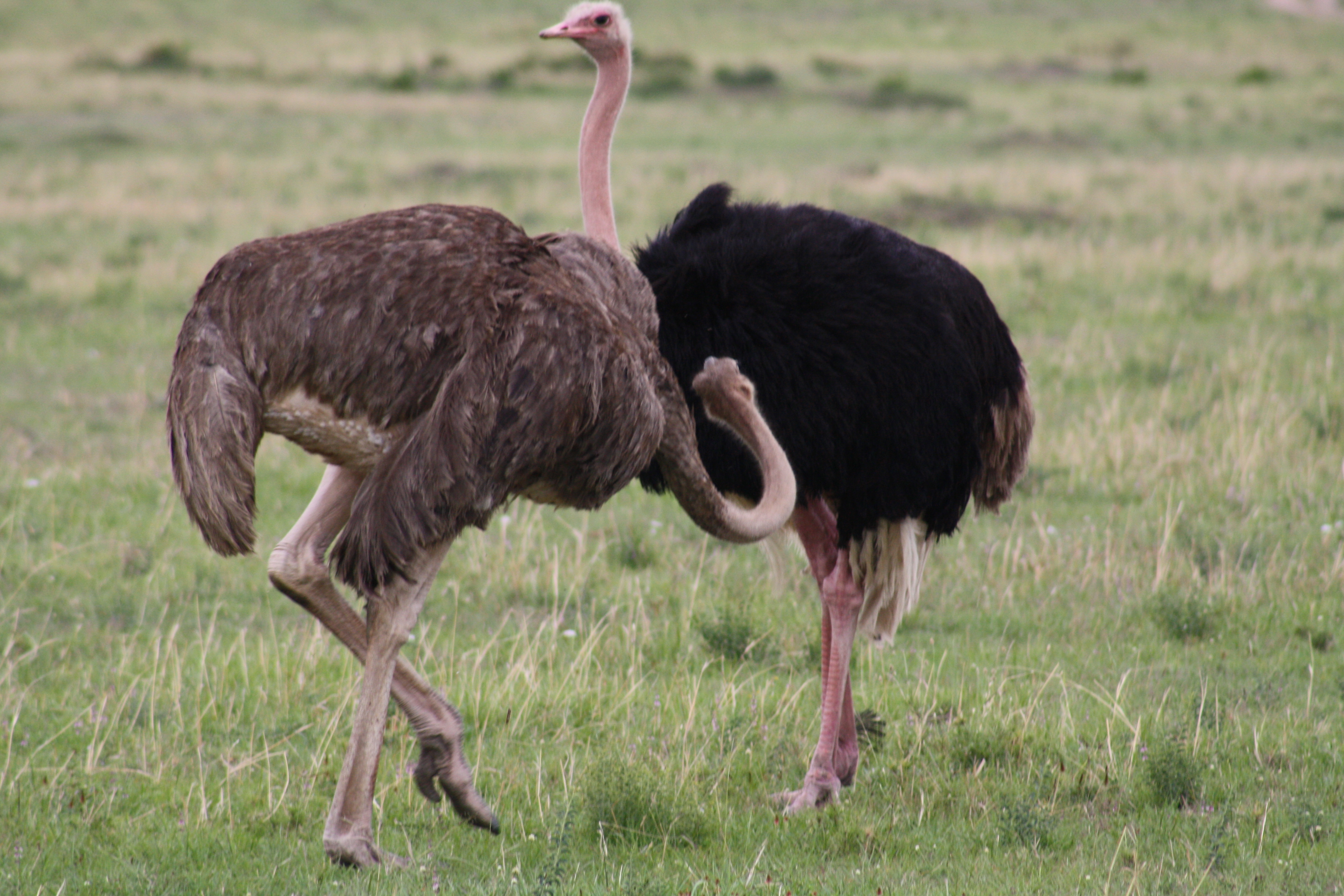
Male and female Masai ostrich (S. c. massaicus) side-by-side comparison.

==== Plumage ====
The feathers of the Masai ostrich lack barbs, which gives them a soft, downy appearance. Similar to other ostrich subspecies, they possess approximately 50–60 tail feathers, 16 primaries, 4 alular, and 20–23 secondary feathers. The wing and tail feathers have evolved to serve as decorative plumes for courtship display rather than flight.

For males, the majority of the body is covered in black feathers. White feathers appear along the tips of the wings, tail, and form a small ring partway up the neck that separates the black body feathers from bare neck skin. The white tail feathers are often discolored from dirt and appear reddish-brown.

Females tend to be smaller than males and also possess bare skin on both the neck and legs, though their skin color appears more beige than pink. Adult females body feathers are a uniformly-distributed, monochromatic color scheme of brown.

==== Reproductive/Excretory organs ====
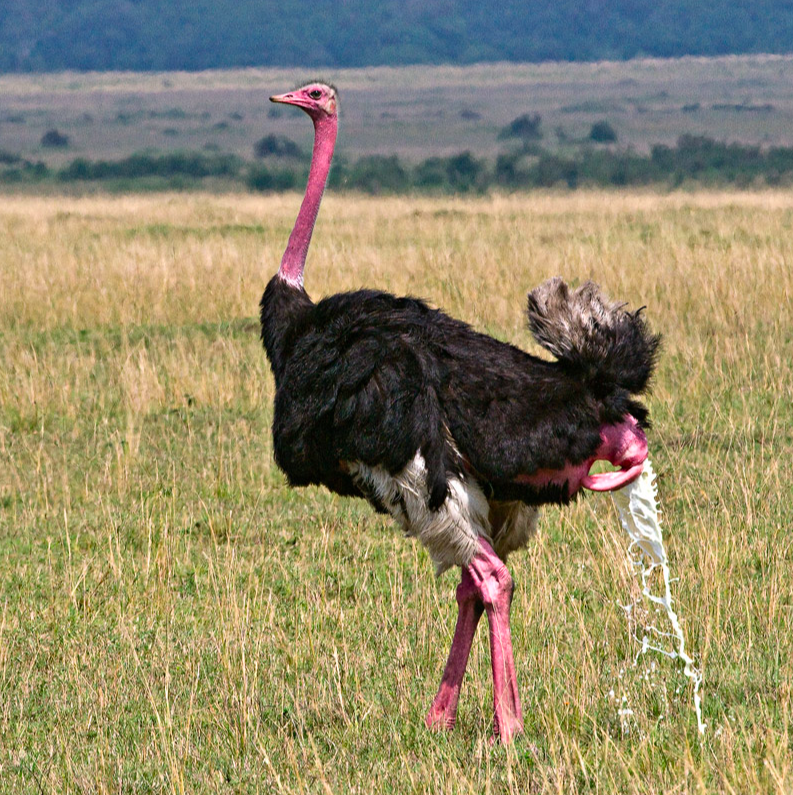
Example of male Masai ostrich everting penis to excrete liquid

Unlike most avian species, male ostriches have a retractable penis that averages 20 cm in length and everts during defecation, urination, and copulation. The ostrich is the only bird to void urine separate from defecation due to the muscular sphincter-like folds located within the cloaca.

==== Environmental adaptations ====
Several physiological adaptations have evolved to allow the Masai ostrich to live in the extreme arid conditions of Sub-Saharan Africa. Their feathers have specialized to work as efficient insulators for proper thermoregulation during both hot and cold climates. Increased aldosterone release and use of mucus in place of water for excretion of uric acid promotes water retention in arid environments. Masai ostriches also possess salt-excreting nasal glands which allow for consumption of salt water from saline and soda lakes when necessary.

== Distribution and habitat ==
Wild Masai ostriches are located across Uganda, Kenya and Tanzania. Denser populations are often found in the semi-arid, open grassy plains of the African savanna. Despite this preference, they have been known to also inhabit desert, dense brush, and steep rocky mountain environments.

== Behavior and ecology ==
=== Breeding ===
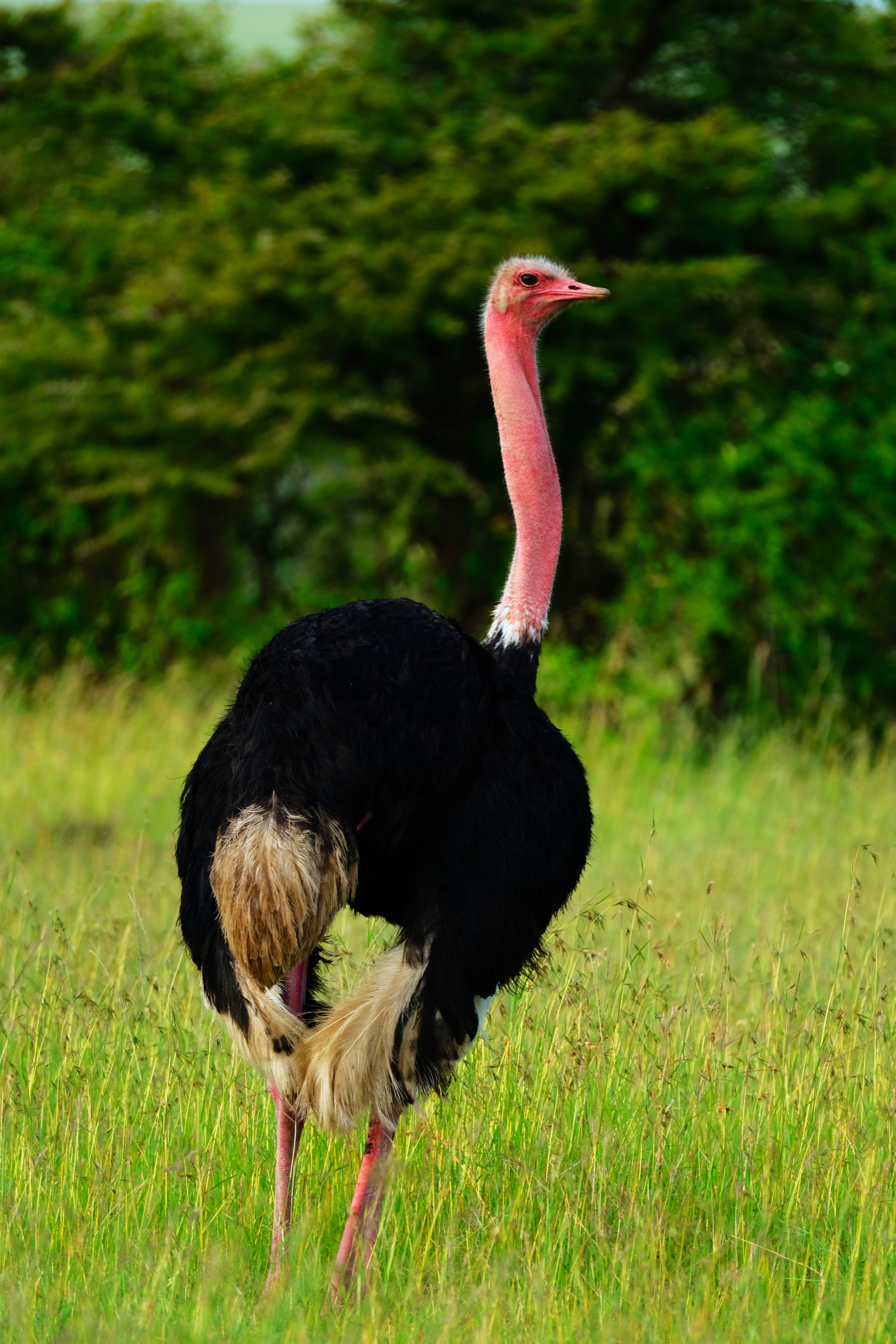
A male Masai ostrich in Naboisho Conservancy, Kenya, showing the characteristic pink hue of a breeding male.

Masai ostrich breeding season begins around May or June. During this time, the pink hue on male Masai ostriches neck and leg skin intensifies as a form of mating display. Mature males begin to establish territories that are about 2–3 km^{2} in area and aggressively defend their domain against other breeding males. They will also construct scrape nests in prior to the arrival of breeding females.

In July, adult female ostriches begin establishing breeding zones that span around 13 km^{2}. These breeding zones overlap with 5–7 male territories, in which males attempt to mate with any adult females that pass through his territory.

==== Communal nesting ====
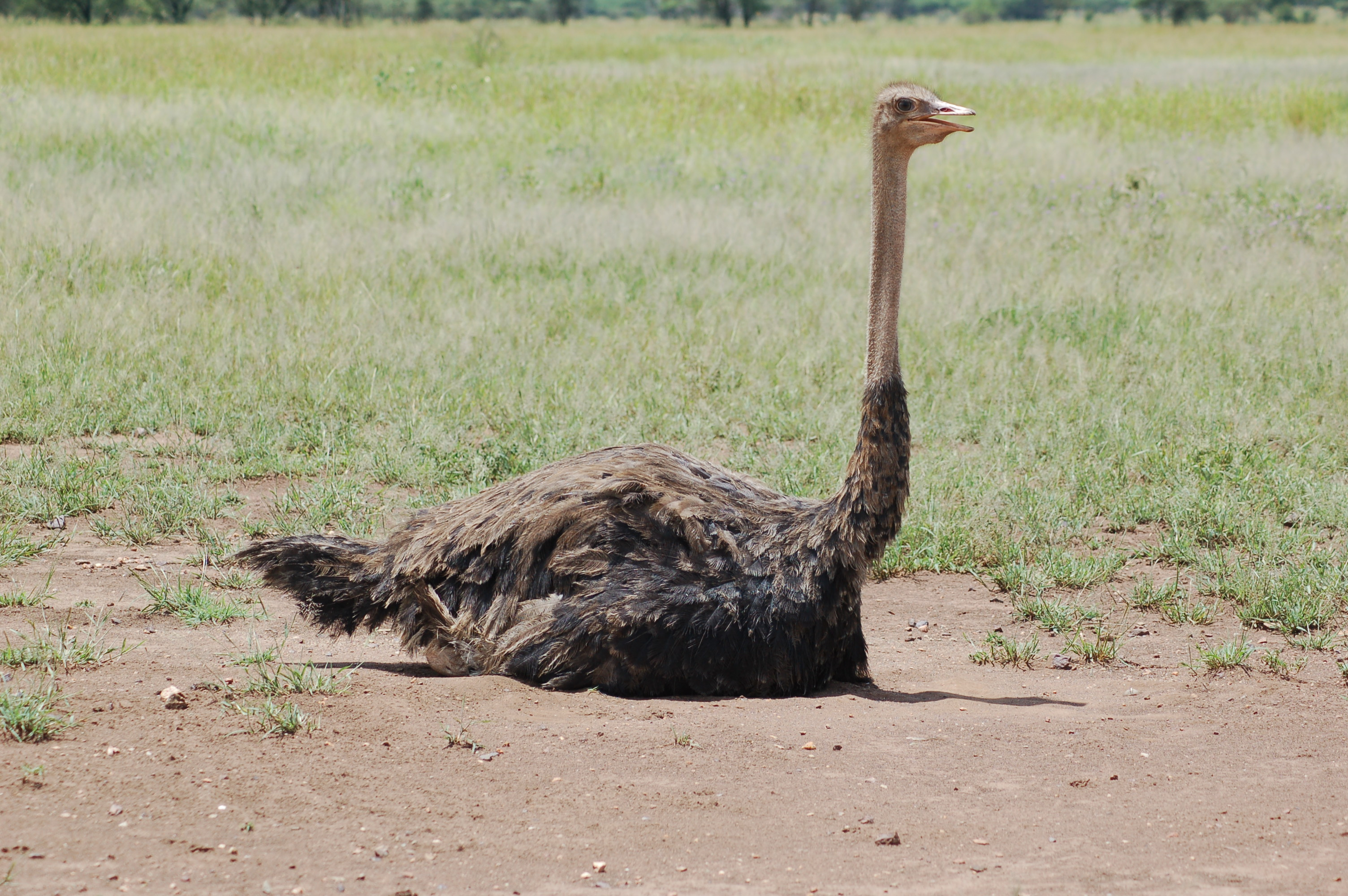
Major Female Masai ostrich incubating eggs

Similar to other ostrich subspecies, the Masai ostrich nests in groups and engages in crѐching behavior where a single (major) female incubates the eggs of several other (minor) females within a single nest. Only 1 out of 3 hens will become a major female. The remaining hens are considered minor females and will not incubate their own eggs. A nest is initiated when a single major female mates with a territorial male who has already prepared a nesting site and performed a complex mating display. After she lays the initial clutch, both her and the territorial male assume primary care of the eggs. The major female lays on average 2 eggs per day and will spend a subsequent 15–90 minutes incubating, then will periodically leave the nest unattended to allow minor females to copulate with the territorial male and lay eggs in the nest. The male will often spend more time incubating the nest than the major female. An upwards of 18 different minor females will lay eggs in a single major females nest, resulting in an excess of eggs. Since both male and female Masai ostriches are only able to incubate 20–21 eggs at a time, the major female will eject excess eggs. A reproductive advantage observed in major females is that they are able to recognize their own eggs and will eject minor female eggs in favor of theirs as a necessary way to reduce nest overcrowding.

==== Eggs ====
Masai ostrich eggs are large (grapefruit-sized) and white in color. They measure 14–16 cm and weigh between 1.0 and 1.6 kg. Egg hatching occurs during October and November, when eastern Africa experiences brief periods of rainfall that generates edible plants that are the Masai ostriches primary food source. Hatchlings are about the size of a domestic chicken hen and are physically precocious, but still require parental care.

The conspicuous size and color of the Masai ostrich eggs makes them an easy target for predation, particularly when major females abandon nests for upwards of two to three weeks prior to incubation. A 2008 study found the salient white egg coloration to be an evolutionary trade-off favoring a reduced risk of eggs overheating and occurrence of embryo mortality over increased predation during these periods of exposure.

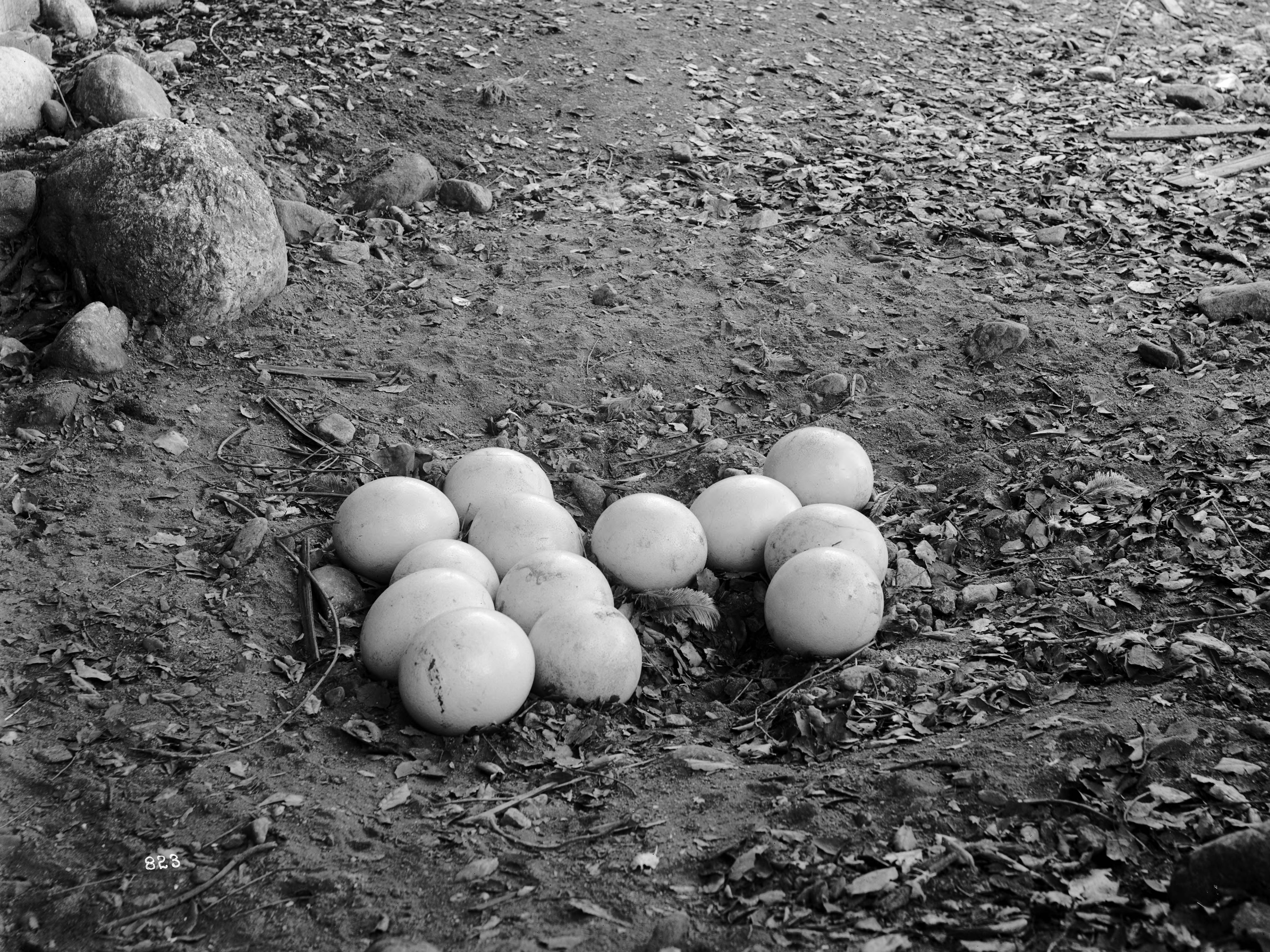
Example of an ostrich nest

=== Food and feeding ===
Like other Struthio camelus subspecies, Masai ostriches are almost entirely herbivorous. Their diet consists mainly of grasses, bushes, herbs, succulents, and leaves. Occasionally they will consume flowers, fruits, seeds, and animal protein (e.g. lizards, insects, etc.), but to a lesser extent.

=== Predators ===
Masai ostriches are not the main prey items for key carnivores. Only lions are the central predator of adults in most areas, but many species prey on ostrich eggs including jackals, hyaenas, lions, and other avian species. Egg predation poses the greatest threat to the reproductive success of wild ostrich populations. Documented instances have attributed 90% of a single flock's chick mortality to be caused purely by predation.

== Relationship to humans ==
Alongside predation, human activity has been shown to have a negative impact on the success of wild Masai ostrich communities. Anthropogenic-induced ostrich population decline is believed to be attributed to rapid human expansion within Sub-Saharan Africa, resulting in reduced resources and territory availability. Collection of ostrich eggs by both locals and tourists within protected areas has also poses a substantial negative impact on their population success. Interestingly, a 2009 study found that illegal hunting of ostrich meat did not significantly affect Masai ostrich population density within the Serengeti National Park.

During the 1990s, worldwide domestication and breeding of the Masai ostrich rose in popularity. The primary products of ostrich farming are meat and leather. S. c. massaicus serves as an ideal alternative meat source due to its large size and notably tender meat. The greater occurrence of type I compared to type II fibres as well as high concentrations of calpain/calpastatin systems in numerous muscle groups in this subspecies are believed to attribute to this tenderness.

Ostrich eggs and feathers have been harvested for ornamental purposes throughout history, but are frequently utilized today by the Maasai as source of food and as a vessel for liquids.

== Status ==
Though Struthio camelus is listed as a species of “least concern” under the IUCN red list, wild ostrich populations are acknowledged to be in decline.
