= Domination =

Domination or dominant may refer to:

== Society ==
- World domination, structure where one dominant power governs the planet
- Colonialism in which one group (usually a nation) invades another region for material gain or to eliminate competition
- Chauvinism in which a person or group consider themselves to be superior, and thus entitled to use force to dominate others
- Sexual dominance involving individuals in a subset of BDSM behaviour
- Hierarchy

== Music ==
- Dominant (music), a diatonic scale step and diatonic function in tonal music theory

=== Albums ===
- Domination (Cannonball Adderley album) or the title track, 1965
- Domination (Morbid Angel album), 1995
- Domination, by Domino, 2004
- Domination, by Morifade, 2004

=== Songs ===
- "Domination" (song), by Pantera, 1990
- "Domination", by Band-Maid from World Domination, 2018
- "Domination", by Symphony X from Paradise Lost, 2007
- "Domination", by Way Out West from Way Out West, 1996
- "Domination", by Within the Ruins from Black Heart, 2020

== Games ==
- Domination (chess), where a chess piece with wide movement cannot avoid capture
- Domination (video game), a turn-based computer game
- Domination (poker), a way of rating a poker hand
- Domination, also known as Focus, a 1964 board game designed by Sid Sackson
- Domination (role-playing game), a tabletop role-playing game
- Domination (play-by-mail game)
- DomiNations, a 2015 mobile strategy game

== Science ==
- Dominant wind, winds that blow predominantly from a single general direction over a particular point on the Earth's surface
- Dominance (linguistics), a relationship between syntactic nodes

=== Biology ===
- Dominance (genetics), one allele is expressed over a second allele at the same locus
- Footedness, the natural preference of one's left or right foot
- Handedness, a better performance or preference for use of a hand
- Ocular dominance, the tendency to prefer visual input from one eye to the other
- Dominance (ecology), the degree to which a taxon is more numerous than its competitors in an ecological community

=== Mathematics ===
- Dominating decision rule, in decision theory
- Domination number, in graph theory
- Dominant map, a type of rational mapping
  - In particular, a dominant morphism
- Dominated convergence theorem, application of function domination in measure theory
- Dominating set, in graph theory

== Other uses ==
- Domination (angel), in Christian angelology
- The Domination, a dystopian alternate history series by S. M. Stirling
- Dominance and submission, in an erotic episode or lifestyle

== See also ==
- Britney: Domination, a 2019 Las Vegas residency concert by Britney Spears
- Dominance (disambiguation)
- Dominator (disambiguation)
- Male dominance (disambiguation)
