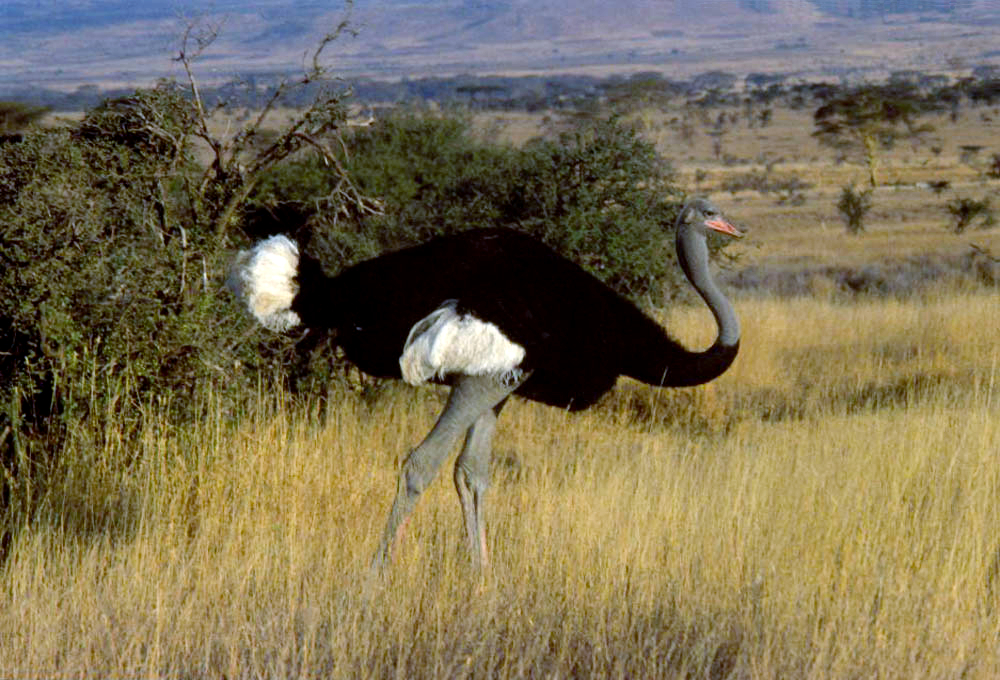
- Male at Lewa Wildlife Conservancy, Kenya
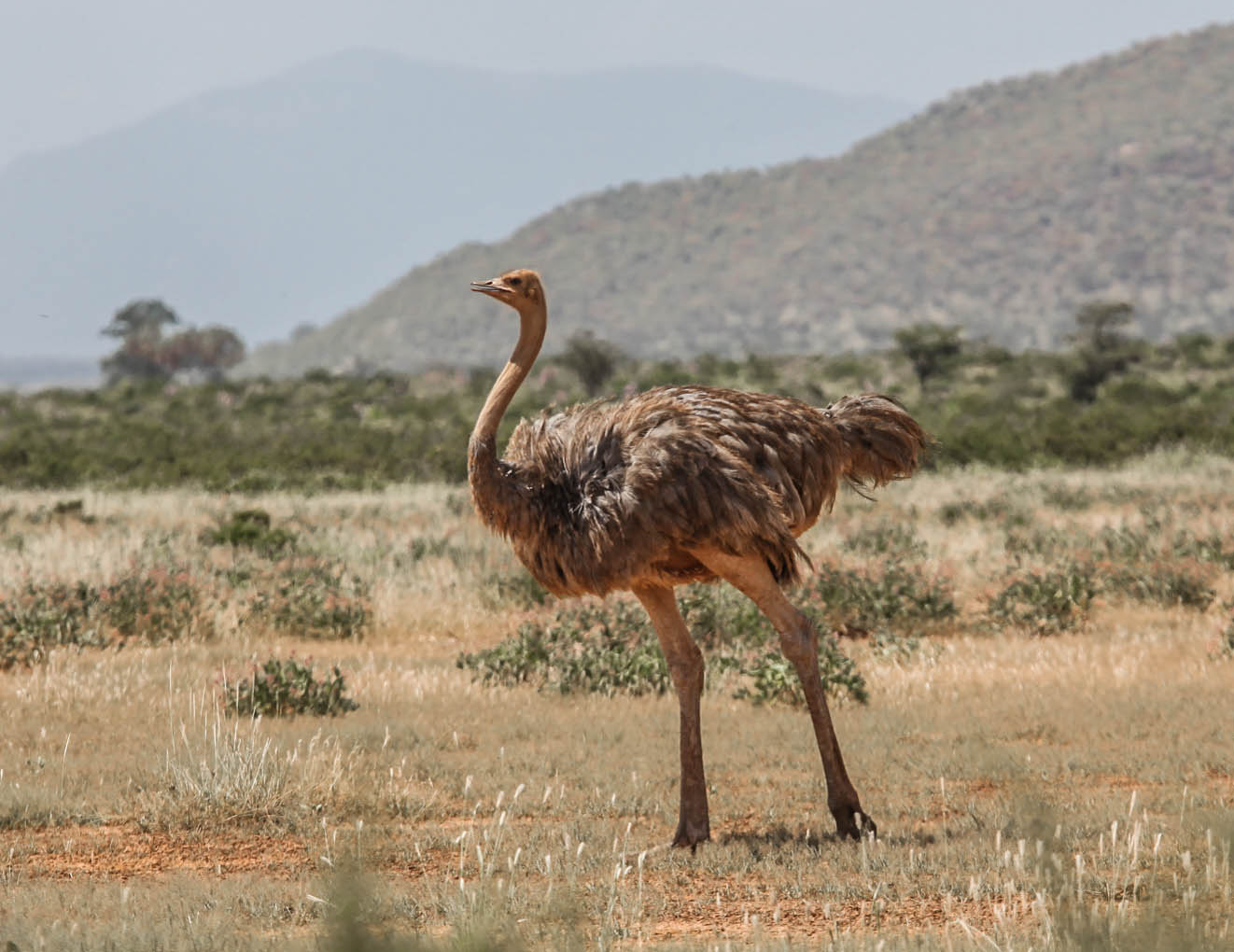
- Female at Samburu National Reserve, Kenya

Conservation status
- Vulnerable (IUCN 3.1)
- CITES Appendix I (Note: Only populations of Algeria, Burkina Faso, Cameroon, Central African Republic, Chad, Mali, Mauritania, Morocco, Niger, Nigeria, Senegal and Sudan. No other populations are included in the CITES Appendices.)

Scientific classification
- Kingdom: Animalia
- Phylum: Chordata
- Class: Aves
- Infraclass: Palaeognathae
- Order: Struthioniformes
- Family: Struthionidae
- Genus: Struthio
- Species: S. molybdophanes

Binomial name
- Struthio molybdophanes Reichenow, 1883
- Yellow area shows range of Struthio molybdophanes

Synonyms
- Struthio camelus molybdophanes Reichenow, 1883

Audio

= Somali ostrich =

Species of flightless bird

The Somali ostrich (Struthio molybdophanes), also known as the blue-necked ostrich, is a large flightless bird native to the Horn of Africa. It is one of two living species of ostriches, the other being the common ostrich. It was also previously considered a subspecies of the common ostrich, but was identified as a distinct species in 2014. For a long time, Somalis partially domesticated some of these ostriches.

== Taxonomy and systematics ==
Struthio molybdophanes was first described in the Norddeutsche allgemeine Zeitung Sunday Supplement of 16 September 1883 by Anton Reichenow, who noted the ostrich's distribution as extending over the plains of Somali- and western Galla-Land on the east coast of Africa from 10 degrees north to the Equator. Molecular evidence indicates that the East African Rift has served as a geographic barrier to isolate the taxon from the nominate subspecies, the North African ostrich S. c. camelus, while ecological and behavioural differences have kept it genetically distinct from the neighbouring Masai ostrich S. c. massaicus. An examination of the mitochondrial DNA of Struthio taxa, including the extinct Arabian ostrich S. c. syriacus, has found that the Somali ostrich is phylogenetically the most distinct, appearing to have diverged from their common ancestor some 3.6 to 4.1 million years ago. The species is monotypic with no subspecies.

== Description ==
Though generally similar to other ostriches, the skin of the neck and thighs of the Somali ostrich is blue-tinged grey (rather than pinkish), becoming brighter blue on the male during the mating season. The neck lacks any broad white ring. The wing primary and tail feathers are white in males, and brown in females. The males are larger than the females. The Somali ostrich is similar in size to other ostriches so far as is known, perhaps averaging marginally smaller in body mass than some subspecies of common ostrich (at least the nominate race, S. c. camelus). Reportedly Somali ostriches in captivity weigh about 105 kg (231 lb) but this may not be an accurate weight for wild birds as captive animals have feeding accesses not available to wild ostriches. It is thus one of the two largest extant bird species.

== Distribution and habitat ==
The Somali ostrich is mostly found in the Horn of Africa, especially in north-eastern Ethiopia, southern Djibouti, most of Kenya, and across most of Somalia.

== Behaviour and ecology ==
The Somali ostrich is differentiated ecologically from the common ostrich, with which there is some range overlap, by preferring bushier, more thickly vegetated areas, where it feeds largely by browsing, whereas the common ostrich is mainly a grazer on open savanna. There are also reports of interbreeding difficulties between the two taxa.

== Relationship with humans ==
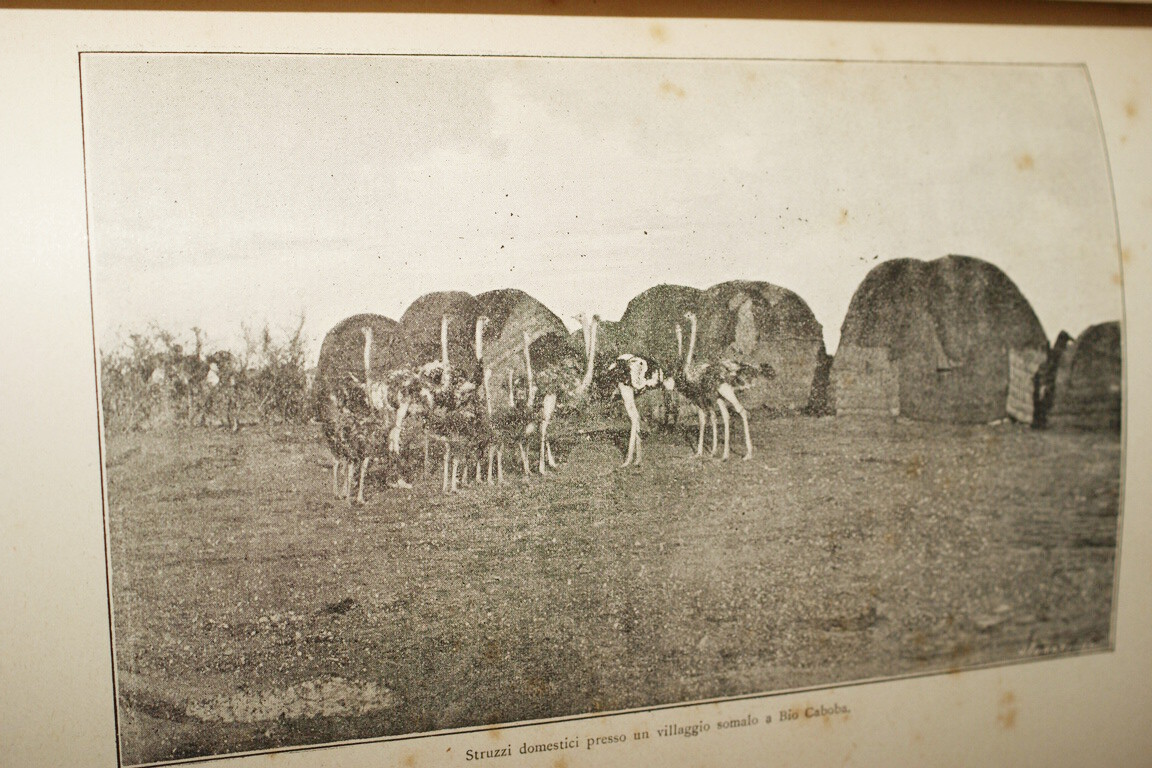
Domestic ostriches at a Somali village in Bio Caboba, 1888. From Nell'Harrar by Luigi Robecchi Bricchetti

For a long time, Somalis partially domesticated some of these ostriches. People use their meats for consumption and the egg for ornamental use. Somali clans used to sell the feathers of tamed ostriches to coastal markets.

The ostrich features prominently in Somali poetic and social language. The early 20th-century poet Qamaan Bulxan alluded to the feather's striking appearance in the line: "Baal-goray waa lagu ogaa, inuu bildhaamaaye!" ("It is known, that the ostrich's feather illuminates!").

== Status and conservation ==
A report to the IUCN in 2006 suggests that the Somali ostrich was common in the central and southern regions of Somalia in the 1970s and 1980s. However, following the political disintegration of that country and the lack of any effective wildlife conservation, its range and numbers there have since been shrinking as a result of uncontrolled hunting for meat, medicinal products and eggs, with the bird facing eradication in the Horn of Africa. In Kenya it is farmed for meat, feathers and eggs.
