= Dominance =

Dominance may refer to:

== Social relationships ==
- Dominance hierarchy or social hierarchy, an organizational form by which individuals within a community control the distribution of resources within the community
- Dominance and submission, set of behaviors, customs, and rituals in an erotic or lifestyle context
- Social dominance theory, a theory of intergroup relations
- Social dominance orientation, a personality trait
- Abusive power and control, the way that an abusive person gains and maintains power and control over another person
- Dual strategies theory, dominance and its counterpart prestige as two strategies for gaining status in human hierarchies

== Biology ==
- Dominance (ethology), in animal behaviour and anthropology, the level of social status relative to other individuals
- Dominance (ecology), the degree of predominance of one or a few species in an ecological community
- Dominance (genetics), a relationship between the effects of different versions of a gene

== Mathematics ==
- Strategic dominance, a method of simplification for games
- Stochastic dominance, a situation in which one lottery (a probability distribution of outcomes) can be ranked as superior to another, with only limited knowledge of preferences
- Dominance order, a partial order
- Dominance drawing, a style of graph drawing

== Other ==
- Dominance (C++), an aspect of virtual inheritance in the C++ programming language
- Dominance (economics), in economics, the degree of inequality in market share distribution
- Dominatrix, a woman who takes the dominant role in BDSM activities
- Strategic dominance, in game theory, when one strategy is better for one opponent regardless of the other opponent's strategy
- Dominance (linguistics), a relationship between syntactic nodes
- Dominance (geography), a radius used with topographic isolation
- Male dominance (BDSM), BDSM activities where the dominant partner is male

== See also ==
- Dominate, mid-to-late Roman Empire order
- Domination (disambiguation)
- Dominator (disambiguation)
- World domination (disambiguation)
- Social dominance (disambiguation)
