= Boldness =

Vigour and valour in action

Boldness is the opposite of shyness. To be bold implies a willingness to get things done despite risks.

For example, in the context of sociability, a bold person may be willing to risk shame or rejection in social situations, or to bend rules of etiquette or politeness. An excessively bold person could aggressively ask for money, or persistently push someone to fulfill a request.

The word bold may also be used as a synonym of impudent; for example, a child may be punished for being "bold" by acting disrespectfully toward an adult or by misbehaving.

Boldness as a philosophical virtue was admired by the ancient Greeks.

Boldness may be contrasted with courage in that the latter implies having fear but confronting it.

== Description ==
In behavioral ecology, the shy⟷bold continuum is studied as it exists in humans and certain other species. Shyness and boldness represent "a propensity to take risks". Bold individuals tend to become dominant, revealing a correlation between boldness and social dominance.

== See also ==
- Assertiveness – Capacity of being self-assured without being aggressive to defend a point of view
- Chutzpah – Presumptuous audacity
- Courage – Ability to deal with fear
- Disinhibition – Lack of restraint
- Parrhesia – Rhetoric practice
- Psychopathy – Personality construct
- Shyness – Feeling of apprehension, discomfort or awkwardness in the presence of other people
- Sisu – Finnish concept
