= Struthio coppensi =

Struthio coppensi Temporal range: early Miocene Early Miocene

Scientific classification
- Kingdom: Animalia
- Phylum: Chordata
- Class: Aves
- Infraclass: Palaeognathae
- Order: Struthioniformes
- Family: Struthionidae
- Genus: Struthio
- Species: †S. coppensi

Binomial name
- †Struthio coppensi Mourer-Chauviré et al. 1996

Extinct species of ostrich

Struthio coppensi is an extinct species of ostrich from Namibia. This ostrich is believed to have lived during the Miocene, about 20 mya, and is the oldest member of the Struthio genus. It was smaller than the extant Common Ostrich, at about 65% the dimensions.
