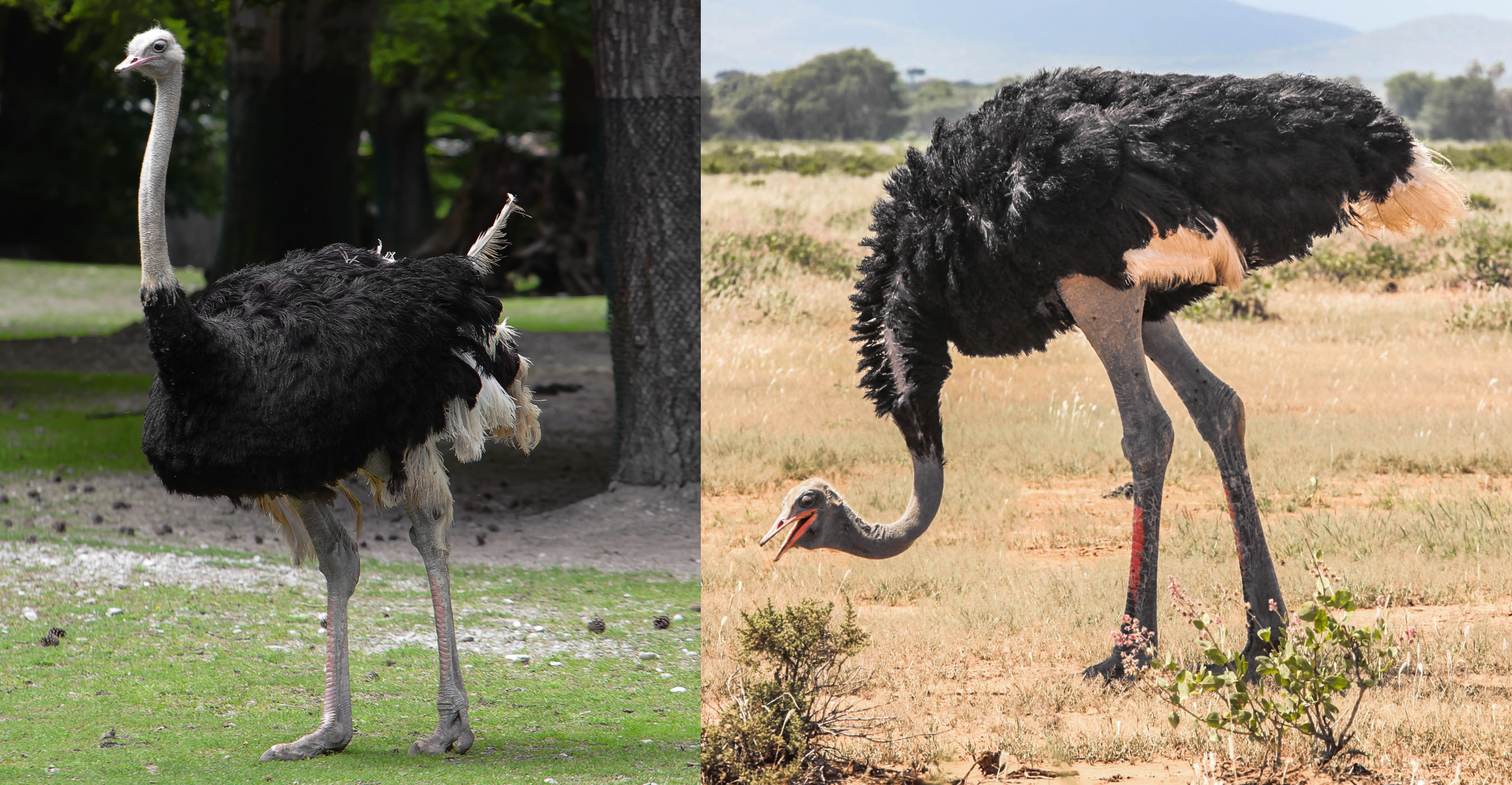
- The two living species, from left: the common ostrich and Somali ostrich

Scientific classification
- Kingdom: Animalia
- Phylum: Chordata
- Class: Aves
- Infraclass: Palaeognathae
- Order: Struthioniformes
- Family: Struthionidae
- Genus: Struthio; Linnaeus, 1758

Type species
- Struthio camelus Linnaeus, 1758

Species
- †S. anderssoni East Asian ostrich; ?†S. barbarus; ?†S. chersonensis Short-toed ostrich; ?†S. kakesiensis; ?†S. karingarabensis; †S. asiaticus Asian ostrich; †S. brachydactylus; †S. coppensi; †S. oldawayi; †S. orlovi; †S. wimani; S. molybdophanes Somali ostrich; S. camelus Common ostrich; †S. daberasensis

Synonyms
- †Autruchon Temminick 1840 fide Gray, 1841 (nomen nudum); †Struthiolithus Brandt 1873; †Megaloscelornis Lydekker 1879; †Palaeostruthio Burchak-Abramovich 1953

= Ostrich =

Ostrich Temporal range: Miocene–Holocene, 23–0 Ma

Genus of largest living birds

Ostriches are large flightless birds. Two living species are recognised: the common ostrich, native to large parts of Sub-Saharan Africa, and the Somali ostrich, native to the Horn of Africa.

They are the heaviest and largest living birds, with adult common ostriches weighing anywhere between 63.5–145 kg (140–320 lb), and laying the largest eggs of any living land animal. With the ability to run at 70 km/h (43 mph), they are the fastest birds on land. They are farmed worldwide, with significant industries in the Philippines and in Namibia. South Africa produces about 70% of global ostrich products, with the industry largely centered around the town of Oudtshoorn. Ostrich leather is a lucrative commodity, and the large feathers are used as plumes for the decoration of ceremonial headgear. Ostrich eggs and meat have been used by humans for millennia. Ostrich oil is another product that is made using ostrich fat.

Ostriches belong to the genus Struthio in the order Struthioniformes, part of the infra-class Palaeognathae, a diverse group of flightless and weakly-flying birds also known as ratites that includes the cassowaries, emus, rheas, kiwi, tinamous, and the extinct elephant birds and moa.

The common ostrich was historically native to the Arabian Peninsula. Further, ostriches were present across Asia as far east as China and Mongolia during the Late Pleistocene and possibly into the Holocene.

Mating dance of the ostrich.

== Taxonomic history ==
The genus Struthio was first described by Carl Linnaeus in 1758. The genus was used by Linnaeus and other early taxonomists to include the emu, rhea, and cassowary, until they each were placed in their own genera. The Somali ostrich (Struthio molybdophanes) has recently become recognised as a separate species by most authorities, while others are still reviewing the evidence.

== Evolution ==
Struthionidae is a member of the Struthioniformes, a group of paleognath birds which first appeared during the Early Eocene, and includes a variety of flightless forms which were present across the Northern Hemisphere (Europe, Asia and North America) during the Eocene epoch. The closest relatives of Struthionidae within the Struthioniformes are the Ergilornithidae, known from the late Eocene to early Pliocene of Asia. It is therefore most likely that Struthionidae originated in Asia.

The earliest fossils of the genus Struthio are from the early Miocene ~21 million years ago in Namibia in Africa; as such, it is proposed that genus is of African origin. By the middle to late Miocene (5–13 mya) they had spread to and become widespread across Eurasia. While the relationship of the African fossil species is comparatively straightforward, many Asian species of ostrich have been described from fragmentary remains, and their interrelationships and how they relate to the African ostriches are confusing. In India, Mongolia and China, ostriches are known to have become extinct only around, or even after, the end of the last ice age; images of ostriches have been found prehistoric Chinese pottery and petroglyphs.

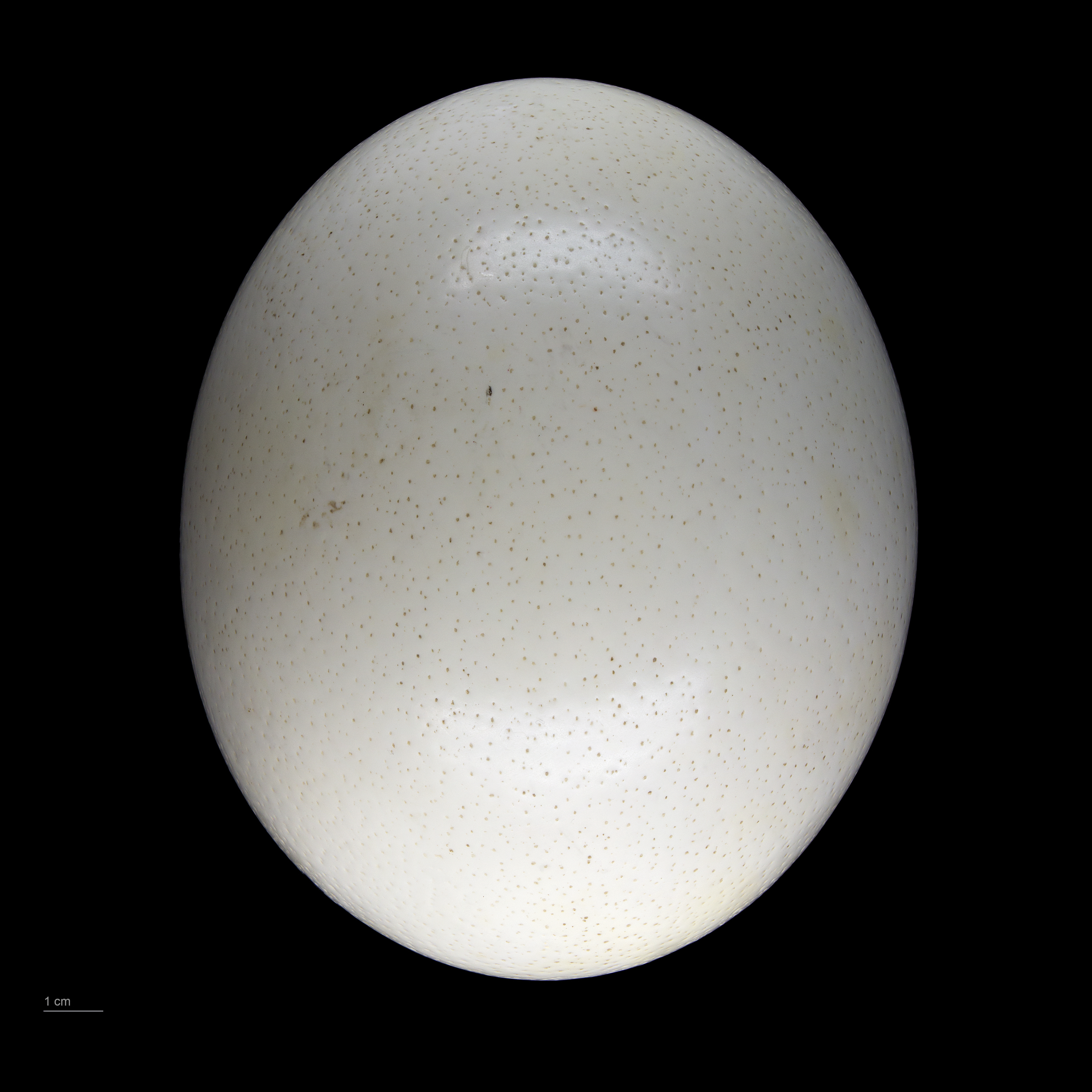
Struthio camelus egg – MHNT

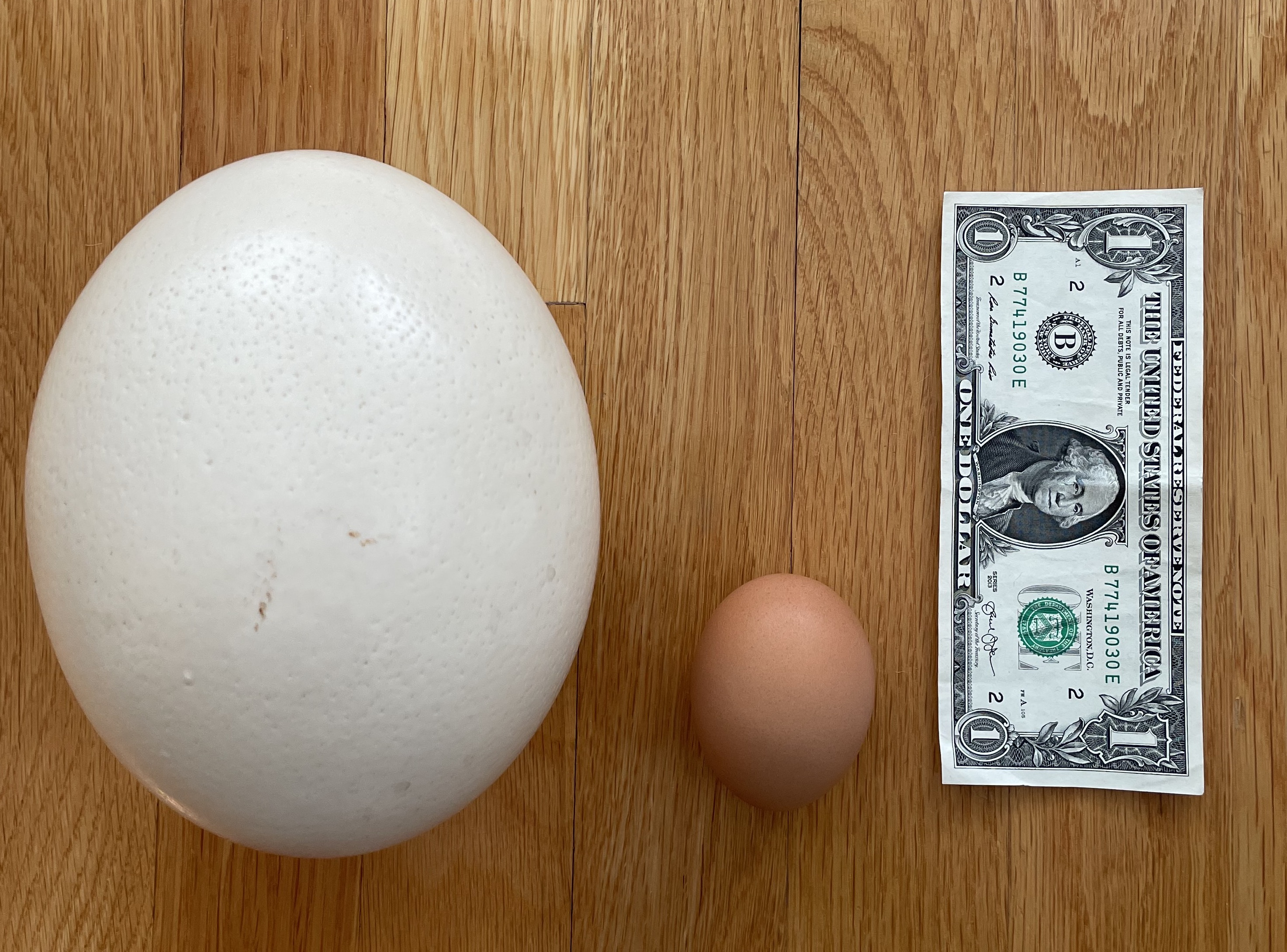
Size comparison (with a chicken egg and a US dollar bill)

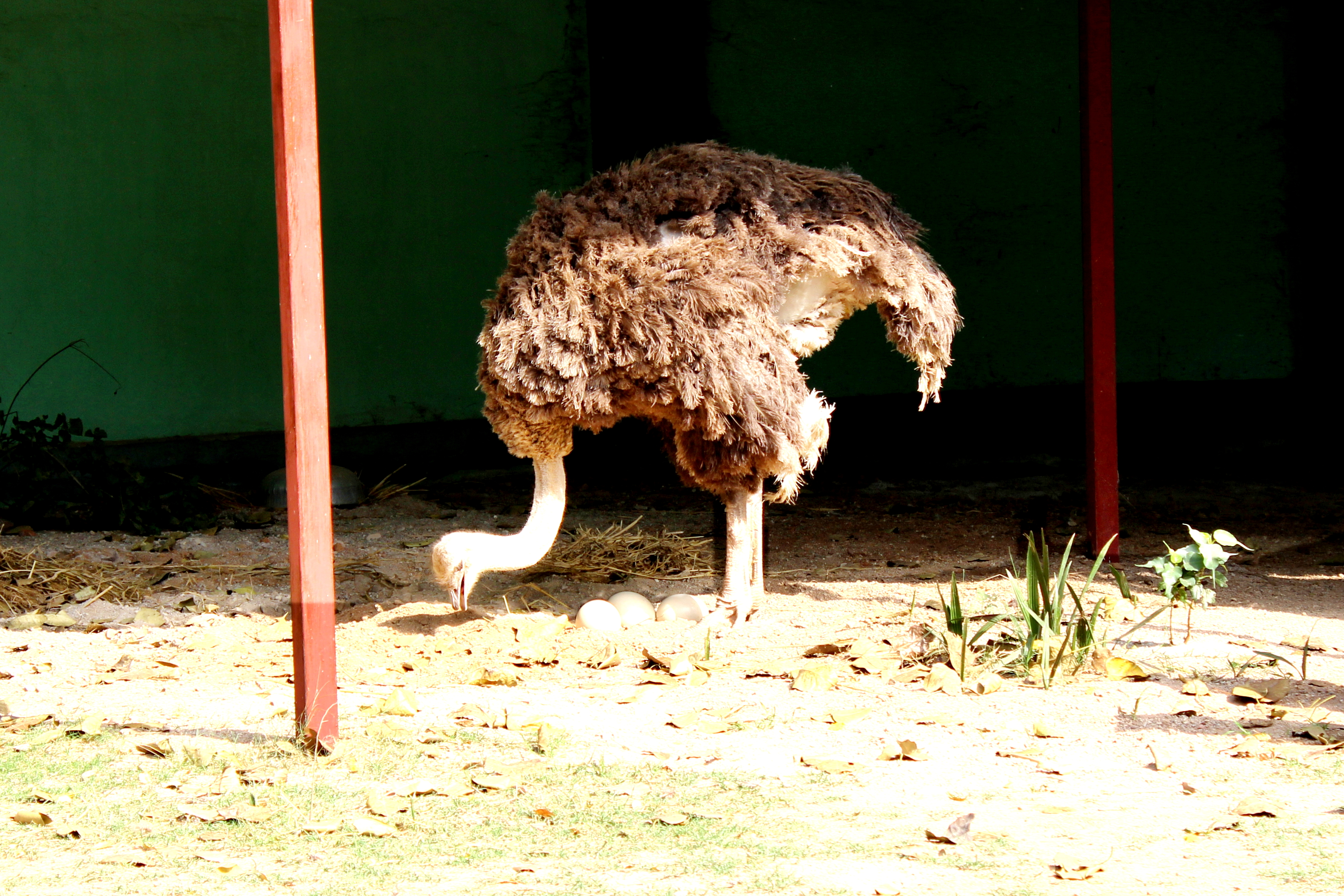
Ostrich with eggs

A young woman rides an ostrich while touring an ostrich farm in California, early 20th century

== Distribution and habitat ==
Today, ostriches are only found naturally in the wild in Africa, where they occur in a range of open arid and semi-arid habitats such as savannas and the Sahel, both north and south of the equatorial forest zone. The Somali ostrich occurs in the Horn of Africa, having evolved isolated from the common ostrich by the geographic barrier of the East African Rift. In some areas, the common ostrich's Masai subspecies occurs alongside the Somali ostrich, but they are kept from interbreeding by behavioural and ecological differences. The Arabian ostriches in Asia Minor and Arabia were hunted to extinction by the middle of the 20th century; in Israel, attempts to introduce North African ostriches to fill their ecological role have failed. Escaped common ostriches in Australia have established feral populations.

== Diet ==
Ostriches are omnivores although plants make up the majority of their diet. They primarily eat plant foods including leafy greens, roots, grasses, fruit and succulents. They will also eat small animals such as lizards, frogs and mice, as well as insects such as grasshoppers or locusts.

Ostriches do not have teeth, and like other birds, swallow sand and pebbles to grind food in their stomachs.

== Species ==
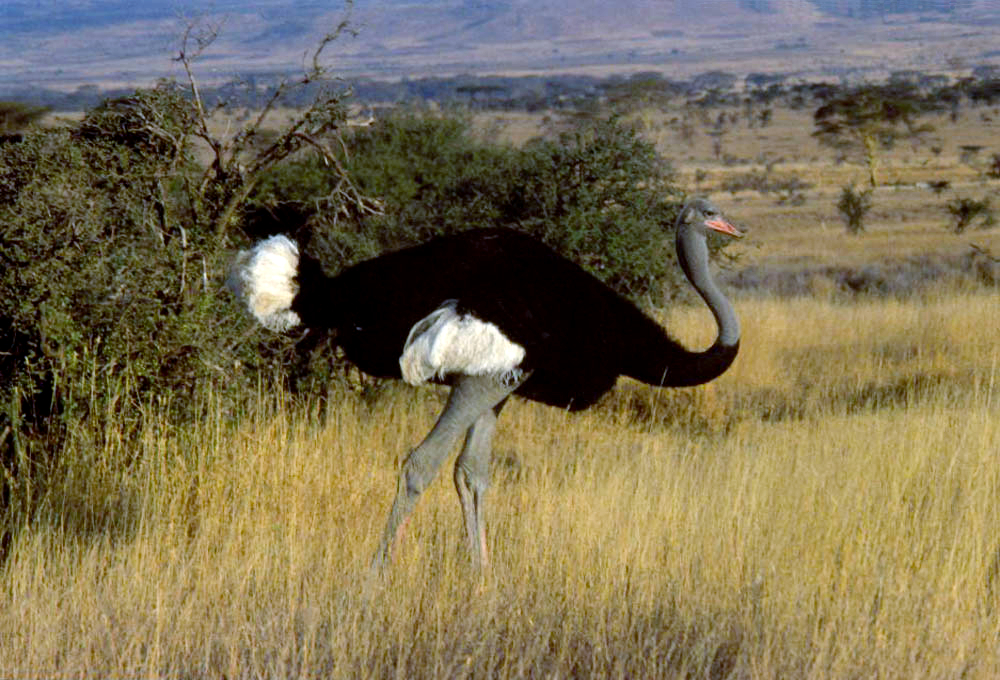
A male Somali ostrich in a Kenyan savanna, showing its blueish neck

In 2008, S. linxiaensis was transferred to the genus Orientornis. Three additional species, S. pannonicus, S. dmanisensis, and S. transcaucasicus, were transferred to the genus Pachystruthio in 2019. Several additional fossil forms are ichnotaxa (that is, classified according to the organism's trace fossils such as footprints rather than its body) and their association with those described from distinctive bones is contentious and in need of revision pending more good material.

The species are:

- Prehistoric
  - †Struthio barbarus Arambourg 1979
  - †Struthio brachydactylus Burchak-Abramovich 1939 (Pliocene of Ukraine)
  - †Struthio chersonensis (Brandt 1873) Lambrecht 1921 (Pliocene of SE Europe to WC Asia) – oospecies
  - †Struthio coppensi Mourer-Chauviré et al. 1996 (Early Miocene of Elizabethfeld, Namibia)
  - †Struthio daberasensis Pickford, Senut & Dauphin 1995 (Early – Middle Pliocene of Namibia) – oospecies
  - †Struthio kakesiensis Harrison & Msuya 2005 (Early Pliocene of Laetoli, Tanzania) – oospecies
  - †Struthio karingarabensis Senut, Dauphin & Pickford 1998 (Late Miocene – Early Pliocene of SW and CE Africa) – oospecies(?)
  - †Struthio oldawayi Lowe 1933 (Early Pleistocene of Tanzania)
  - †Struthio orlovi Kuročkin & Lungo 1970 (Late Miocene of Moldavia)
  - †Struthio wimani Lowe 1931 (Early Pliocene of China and Mongolia)
- Late Pleistocene – Holocene
  - †Struthio anderssoni Lowe 1931, East Asian ostrich (Late Pleistocene of China to Mongolia) –
  - †Struthio asiaticus Brodkorb 1863, Asian ostrich (Early Pliocene – Early Holocene of Central Asia to China? and Morocco)
  - Struthio camelus, common ostrich
    - Struthio camelus camelus, North African ostrich
    - Struthio camelus massaicus, Masai ostrich
    - Struthio camelus australis, South African ostrich
    - †Struthio camelus syriacus, Arabian ostrich
  - Struthio molybdophanes, Somali ostrich

== General and cited references ==
- Andersson, Johan Gunnar (1943). "Researches into the prehistory of the Chinese". Bulletin of the Museum of Far Eastern Antiquities. 15: 1–300, plus 200 plates.
- Brands, Sheila (14 Aug 2008). "Taxon: Genus Struthio". Project: The Taxonomicon.
- Davies, S. J. J. F. (2003). "Ostriches". In Hutchins, Michael (ed.). Birds I Tinamous and Ratites to Hoatzins. Grzimek's Animal Life Encyclopedia. Vol. 8 (2nd ed.). Farmington Hills, MI: Gale Group. p. 99. ISBN 978-0-7876-5784-0.
- Hou, L.; Zhou, Z.; Zhang, F.; Wang, Z. (Aug 2005). "A Miocene ostrich fossil from Gansu Province, northwest China". Chinese Science Bulletin. 50 (16): 1808–1810. Bibcode:2005ChSBu..50.1808H. doi:10.1360/982005-575 (inactive 12 July 2025). ISSN 1861-9541. S2CID 129449364.
- Janz, Lisa; et al. (2009). "Dating North Asian surface assemblages with ostrich eggshell: Implications for palaeoecology and extirpation". Journal of Archaeological Science. 36 (9): 1982–1989. Bibcode:2009JArSc..36.1982J. doi:10.1016/j.jas.2009.05.012.
- "Seagull Publishers:: K-8 segment | Books | Practice manuals". Seagull Learning – A Unit of Seagull Publishers Private Limited. 7. 20 July 2023.
