= Struthio kakesiensis =

Struthio kakesiensis Temporal range: Late Miocene–Early Pliocene

Egg fossil classification
- Basic shell type: Ornithoid
- Morphotype: Ornithoid-ratite
- Oospecies: †Struthio kakesiensis Harrison & Msuya, 2005

Extinct species of bird

Struthio kakesiensis is an extinct oospecies of ratite bird known from eggshell fossils found in Laetoli, Tanzania. It was related to the modern day Struthio.
