= Dominator =

Dominator(s) may refer to:

== People ==
- The Dominator, nickname for Mariusz Pudzianowski (Strongman and MMA fighter), a five-time World's Strongest Man
- The Dominator, nickname for Wayne Johnston (born 1957), a Carlton footballer in Australia
- The Dominator, nickname for Dominik Hašek, a Czech goalkeeper who played for HC Pardubice, Chicago Blackhawks, Buffalo Sabres, Detroit Red Wings and Ottawa Senators
- Dominator, also known as Nils Fjellström, the drummer for Dark Funeral, Myrkskog, The Wretched End and ex-drummer for Aeon

== Music ==
- Dominator (Cloven Hoof album), an album by metal band Cloven Hoof
- Dominator (W.A.S.P. album), an album by metal band W.A.S.P.
- Dominator (The Time Frequency album), an album by Scottish techno band The Time Frequency
- Dominator (U.D.O. album), an album by metal band U.D.O.
- "Dominator" (Human Resource song), a 1991 Human Resource song
- Geraint Watkins & the Dominators, British band
- Dominator, music festival of Q-dance

== Amusement parks ==
- Dominator (roller coaster), a roller coaster formerly at Geauga Lake, now located at Kings Dominion
- Dominator (ride), a ride at the Dorney Park & Wildwater Kingdom

== Fiction and entertainment ==
- Dominators (DC Comics), a fictional alien race published by DC Comics
- The Dominators, a 1968 Doctor Who serial and a fictional alien race in that universe
- The Dominators (novel), an unpublished novel by Donald Hamilton
- Dominator, a 1984 novel by James Follett
- The Dominator, the antagonist of the first four novels of Glen Cook's The Black Company series
- Dominator, a type of accessory for Nintendo
- Dominator, a fictional vehicle from the G.I. Joe Battleforce 2000 toy line
- Dominator (comics), a British comic character and its adaptations created by Tony Luke
- The Dominator-class cruiser, a carrier type in the Imperial Navy in the Warhammer 40,000 universe
- Dominators, a character archetype in the computer game City of Villains
- Burnout Dominator, a 2007 video game in the PlayStation Burnout series
- Dominators, the psychometrically-activated weapons used by law enforcement officers in the anime series Psycho-Pass
- The Dominator, a minor antagonist in the fifth season of Samurai Jack
- The Dominator, the final boss of the 2019 video game Daemon X Machina

== Transportation ==
- Consolidated B-32 Dominator, a late World War II American strategic bomber
- Honda NX650 Dominator, a dual sport motorcycle by Honda
- SS Dominator, a Greek freighter lost in a 1961 shipwreck on the Palos Verdes Peninsula in California
- Aeronautics Defense Dominator, an Israeli UAV developed by Aeronautics Defense Systems Ltd
- Dennis Dominator, a bus chassis model manufactured by Dennis Specialist Vehicles
- Dominator, a name for the Persistent Munition Technology Demonstrator UAV developed by Boeing
- SRV Dominator, a tornado research vehicle built by Reed Timmer

== Other uses ==
- Dominator (graph theory), in computer science, a property of certain nodes in control-flow graphs
- Dominator culture, a term coined by futurist and writer Riane Eisler
- The Dominator, or Inverted Powerbomb, a professional wrestling move

== See also ==
- Domination (disambiguation)
- Dominance (disambiguation)
- Dominate, the "despotic" later phase of government in the ancient Roman Empire
- Dominatrix, the female form of the word
