= Struthio orlovi =

Struthio orlovi Temporal range: Late Miocene Late Miocene

Scientific classification
- Kingdom: Animalia
- Phylum: Chordata
- Class: Aves
- Infraclass: Palaeognathae
- Order: Struthioniformes
- Family: Struthionidae
- Genus: Struthio
- Species: S. orlovi

Binomial name
- Struthio orlovi Kuročkin & Lungo, 1970

Extinct species of bird

Struthio orlovi is an extinct species of ostrich bird from the Miocene of Moldavia. It was comparable in size to the extant Common Ostrich.
