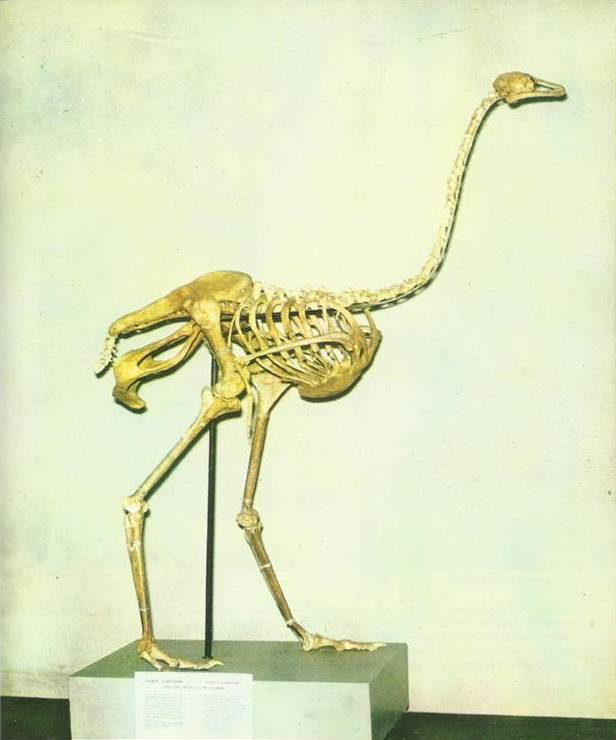
- Asian ostrich skeleton

Scientific classification
- Kingdom: Animalia
- Phylum: Chordata
- Class: Aves
- Infraclass: Palaeognathae
- Order: Struthioniformes
- Family: Struthionidae
- Genus: Struthio
- Species: †S. asiaticus

Binomial name
- †Struthio asiaticus Milne-Edwards, 1871

Synonyms
- Struthio indicus Bidwell, 1910; Struthio palaeindicus Falconer, 1868 (nomen nudum); Megaloscelornis sivalensis Lydekker, 1879

= Asian ostrich =

Asian ostrich Temporal range: Neogene

Extinct species of bird

The Asian or Asiatic ostrich (Struthio asiaticus) is an extinct species of ostrich that lived during the Neogene period on the Indian subcontinent.

== Discovery ==
The early records that ranged from the Pliocene Epoch in Africa to the Pleistocene-Holocene Epoch in northeastern Asia are considered dubious. Beads made from shells taken from archaeological sites in India dating to more than 25,000 years were found to have traces of DNA and analysis of sequences examined from them show that the species is definitely in the genus Struthio.

== Description ==
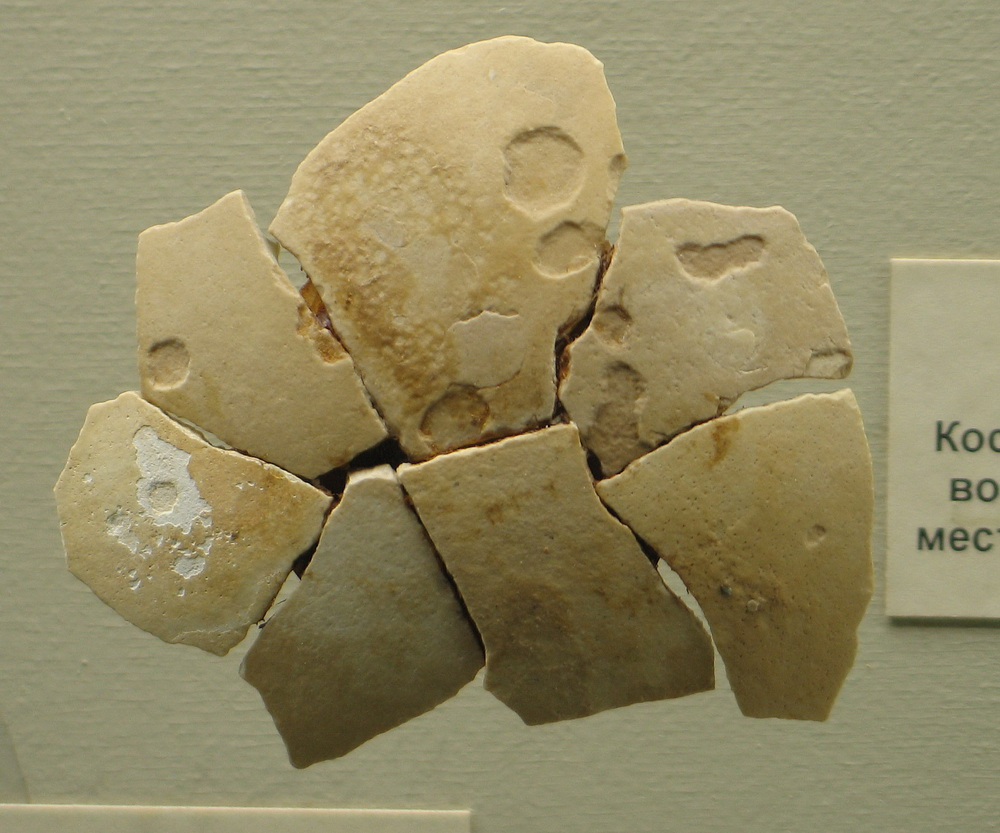
Asian ostrich egg shells

Asian ostriches were large, being more robustly built and reaching about the same height as an adult male of the extant common ostrich. It may have had short toes, but this is considered a tentative assumption. A specimen from the Pliocene of Morocco could be 20% bigger than an adult male of the extant Struthio camelus, but the African specimens are considered dubious, and the "exact proportions are difficult to reconstruct on the basis of the available material."

== Works cited ==
- Sharpe, R. Bowdler (1899). A Handlist of the Genera and Species of Birds. Vol. I. Red Lion Court Fleet Street, London UK: Taylor and Francis. p. 2.
- Buffetaut, E. (2022). Feduccia, A. (ed.). "The First-Named Fossil Ostrich: A Revision of Struthio asiaticus, from the Siwaliks of India". Diversity. 14 (10): 860. doi:10.3390/d14100860.
- Jain, Sonal; Rai, Niraj; Kumar, Giriraj; Pruthi, Parul Aggarwal; Thangaraj, Kumarasamy; Bajpai, Sunil; Pruthi, Vikas (2017). "Ancient DNA Reveals Late Pleistocene Existence of Ostriches in Indian Sub-Continent". PLOS ONE. 12 (3) e0164823. Bibcode:2017PLoSO..1264823J. doi:10.1371/journal.pone.0164823. PMC 5342186. PMID 28273082.
- Mayr, Gerald (October 31, 2016). Avian Evolution. The Fossil Record of Birds and Its Paleobiological Significance. Wiley. p. 98. ISBN 978-1-119-02076-9.
- Mourer-Chauviré, Cécile; Geraads, Denis (January 2008). "The Struthionidae and Pelagornithidae (Aves: Struthioniformes, Odontopterygiformes) from the late Pliocene of Ahl Al Oughlam, Morocco". Oryctos. 7: 169–194.

== Additional reading ==
- Paleobiology Database (2012). "Struthio asiaticus". Paleobiology Database.
- Routledge, Jennifer (2020). "Ostrich Eggshell from the Far Eastern Steppe: Stable Isotopic Exploration of Range, Commodification, and Extirpation". ProQuest Dissertations Publishing, 2020
