= Male dominance =

Male dominance may refer to:

- Male dominance (BDSM)
- Male privilege, a system of advantages available to men on the basis of sex
- Patriarchy, a system of social organization characterized by male dominance

== See also ==
- Androcentrism, a worldview focusing on male supremacy
- Dominance (ethology), in non-human species
- Male supremacism
