= Domination (poker) =

Poker hand A is said to dominate poker hand B if poker hand B has three or fewer outs (cards to catch) that would improve it enough to win. Informally, domination is sometimes used to refer to any situation where one hand is highly likely to beat another. The term drawing dead is used to denote a domination situation with zero outs.

== Overview ==
In hold'em poker variations, domination usually refers to one of five situations involving the hole cards:

- Pair dominating a shared card and a lower card (QQ vs. Q2). This true case of domination requires the underdog to catch at least two cards to win. The win percentage for the pair ranges from 80 to 90%. How related the underdog's cards are to each other increase the odds (e.g. 99 vs. 98s).
- Higher pair dominating a lower pair (e.g. QQ vs. 99): Barring an unlikely straight or flush possibility, the underdog must catch one of two remaining nines (improving to 999) to beat the QQ.
- A pair dominating higher than at least one of the cards in a non-paired hand (e.g. JJ vs. A8, AJ or 87)
- Sharing a card, a higher kicker dominating a lower kicker (e.g. AJ vs. KJ or AJ vs. A9): Barring an unlikely straight or flush possibility, the underdog must catch one of the three remaining cards of his kicker rank (and not catch one of the three remaining cards of the opponent's kicker rank).
- Suit Domination: Sharing two cards of the same suit (e.g. A♦ K♦ vs. 8♦ 9♦): This is considered domination—despite the 8♦ 9♦ having six outs—because if they both hit the flush the A♦ K♦ will win.

The following table shows examples of common domination situations. The percentages represent preflop pot equity in a heads up confrontation (percentage of winning plus half the percentage of splitting the pot).

vs.	A♦ J♥	9♦ 9♥	8♦ 7♥	8♦ 9♦
J♠ J♣	69.5	81.0	82.2	79.9
A♠ K♣	74.0	44.3	61.9	N/A
A♦ K♦	N/A	N/A	N/A	65.2

The green percentages denote the three common domination situations noted above. In contrast, the brown percentages denote non-domination situations. After the flop domination becomes more complex and there are many domination situations which do not warrant exhaustive treatment however most commonly domination is maintained:

- A higher hand vs. a lower (AJ vs. A9 when an A flops with no 9 or J)
- A higher pair vs. a lower (QQ vs. 99 where no 9 or Q flops)

However a situation can emerge where domination is lost. This can either be a result of :

- the weaker hand adding additional outs (example: JJ vs. A8 where an 8 flops with no J or A)
- the weaker hand becoming stronger but not dominating (example JJ vs 87 with a flop of A-8-7, or 9♦ 9♥ vs. 6♠ 5♠ with a flop of 4♠ 3♠ 5♥)
- The weaker hand can become the dominating hand (example: QQ vs 99 where a 9 but not a Q flops, or J♠ J♣ vs. 8♣ 7♣ on a flop of 6♦ 5♦ 4♦). The term reverse domination is applied to the 3rd case of preflop domination under one of these reversals (example: AJ vs A9 when a 9 but not a J flops, regardless of whether an A flops).

== See also ==
- Poker probability
- Poker probability (Texas hold 'em)
