= World domination (disambiguation) =

World domination is the concept of a single power or ideology dominating the world.

World domination or global domination may also refer to:

== Music ==
- World Domination Enterprises, a UK independent rock band
- World Domination Recordings, a US record label
- World Domination (The Re-Visit), a continuation of The Pussycat Dolls tour - World Domination Tour

=== Albums ===
- World Domination (Band-Maid album), 2018
- World Domination (Kompressor album), 2001

=== Songs ===
- "World Domination", a 1986 hit single by the Belle Stars
- "World Domination", a song by Joey Badass from 1999

== Other ==
- Family Guy: Stewie's Guide to World Domination, a 2005 humor book about the TV show Family Guy written by producer Steve Callaghan
- Age of Empires: World Domination, 2015 mobile real-time strategy game

== See also ==
- Global Conquest, a 1992 computer game
- Global Domination (video game), a 1993 computer game
- World Conquest (play-by-mail game)
- Superpower, a state with a leading position in the international system and the ability to influence events in its own interest by global projection of power
- World government, the notion of a single common political authority for all of humanity
- Global governance, the political interaction of transnational actors
- List of largest empires by maximum extent of land area occupied
- New World Order (conspiracy theory), theories whose theme is that a powerful and secretive elite of globalists are conspiring to eventually rule the world through an autonomous world government
- Risk (game) or La Conquête du Monde, a strategy board game
- Conquer the World, a compilation of strategy games by Microprose
