= Social dominance =

Social dominance may refer to:

- Social dominance orientation
- Social dominance theory
- Power (social and political)

== See also ==
- Dominance (disambiguation)
- Social stratification
