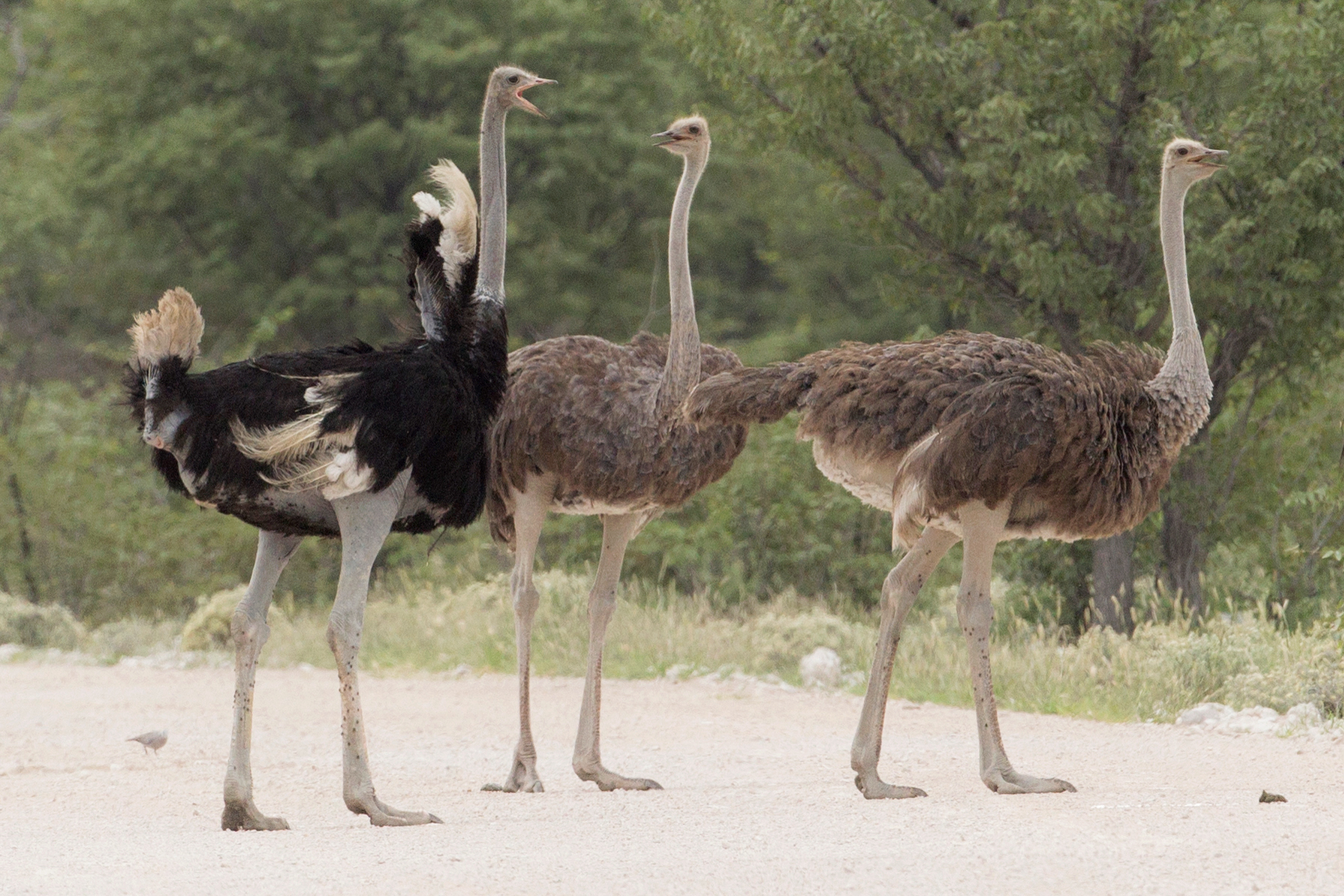
- South African (S. c. australis) male (left) and females

Conservation status
- Least Concern (IUCN 3.1)
- CITES Appendix I (Note: Only populations of Algeria, Burkina Faso, Cameroon, Central African Republic, Chad, Mali, Mauritania, Morocco, Niger, Nigeria, Senegal, and Sudan. No other population is included in the CITES Appendices.)

Scientific classification
- Kingdom: Animalia
- Phylum: Chordata
- Class: Aves
- Infraclass: Palaeognathae
- Order: Struthioniformes
- Family: Struthionidae
- Genus: Struthio
- Species: S. camelus

Binomial name
- Struthio camelus Linnaeus, 1758

Subspecies
- S. c. camelus Linnaeus, 1758 North African ostrich; S. c. australis Gurney, 1868 South African ostrich; S. c. massaicus Neumann, 1898 Masai ostrich; †S. c. syriacus Rothschild, 1919 Arabian ostrich
Struthio distribution map
S. c. camelus	S. c. australis
S. c. massaicus	S. molybdophanes

Synonyms
- List: Charadrius bidactylus G. R. Gray, 1847; Struthio australis Gurney, 1868; Struthio massaicus Neumann, 1898; Struthio camelus spatzi Stresemann, 1926; Struthio camelus rothschildi Grant & Mackworth-Praed, 1951

= Common ostrich =

Common ostrich Temporal range: 15–0 Ma Early Miocene to Present

Species of flightless bird

The common ostrich (Struthio camelus), or simply ostrich, is a species of flightless bird native to certain areas of Africa (and historically, Arabia) and is the largest living species of bird. The common ostrich is one of two extant species of ostriches, the only living members of the genus Struthio in the ratite group of birds. The other is the Somali ostrich (Struthio molybdophanes), which has been recognised as a distinct species by BirdLife International since 2014, having been previously considered a distinctive subspecies of ostrich.

The common ostrich belongs to the order Struthioniformes. Struthioniformes previously contained all the ratites, such as the kiwis, emus, rheas, and cassowaries. However, a recent genetic analysis has found that the group is not monophyletic, as it is paraphyletic with respect to the tinamous, so the ostriches are now classified as the only members of the order. Phylogenetic studies have shown that it is the sister group to all other members of Palaeognathae, and that the flighted tinamous are the sister group to the extinct moa. It is distinctive in its appearance, with a long neck and legs, and can run for a long time at a speed of 55 km/h (34 mph) with short bursts up to about 70 km/h (43 mph), the fastest land speed of any bipedal animal. It lays the largest eggs of any living bird, though the extinct giant elephant bird (Aepyornis maximus) of Madagascar and the South Island giant moa (Dinornis robustus) of New Zealand both laid larger eggs.

The common ostrich's diet consists mainly of plant matter, though it also eats invertebrates and small reptiles. It lives in nomadic groups of 5 to 50 birds. When threatened, the ostrich will either hide itself by lying flat against the ground or run away. If cornered, it can attack with a kick of its powerful legs. Mating patterns differ by geographical region, but territorial males fight for a harem of two to seven females.

The common ostrich is farmed around the world, particularly for its feathers, which are decorative and are also used as feather dusters. Its skin is used for leather products and its meat is sold commercially, with its leanness a common marketing point.

== Description ==
The common ostrich is the tallest and heaviest living bird. Males stand 2.1 to 2.75 m (6 ft 11 in to 9 ft 0 in) tall and weigh 100 to 130 kg (220 to 290 lb), whereas females are about 1.75 to 1.9 m (5 ft 9 in to 6 ft 3 in) tall and weigh 90 to 120 kg (200 to 260 lb). While exceptional male ostriches (in the nominate subspecies) can weigh up to 156.8 kg (346 lb), some specimens in South Africa can only weigh between 59.5 to 81.3 kg (131 to 179 lb). New chicks are fawn-coloured, with dark brown spots. After three months they start to gain their juvenile plumage, which is steadily replaced by adult-like plumage during their second year. At four or five months old, they are already about half the size of an adult bird, and after a year they reach adult height, but not till they are 18 months old will they be fully as heavy as their parents.

The feathers of adult males are mostly black, with white primaries and a white tail. However, the tail of one subspecies is buff. Females and young males are greyish-brown and white. The head and neck of both male and female ostriches are nearly bare, with a thin layer of down. The skin of the female's neck and thighs is pinkish-grey, while the male's is grey or pink dependent on subspecies.

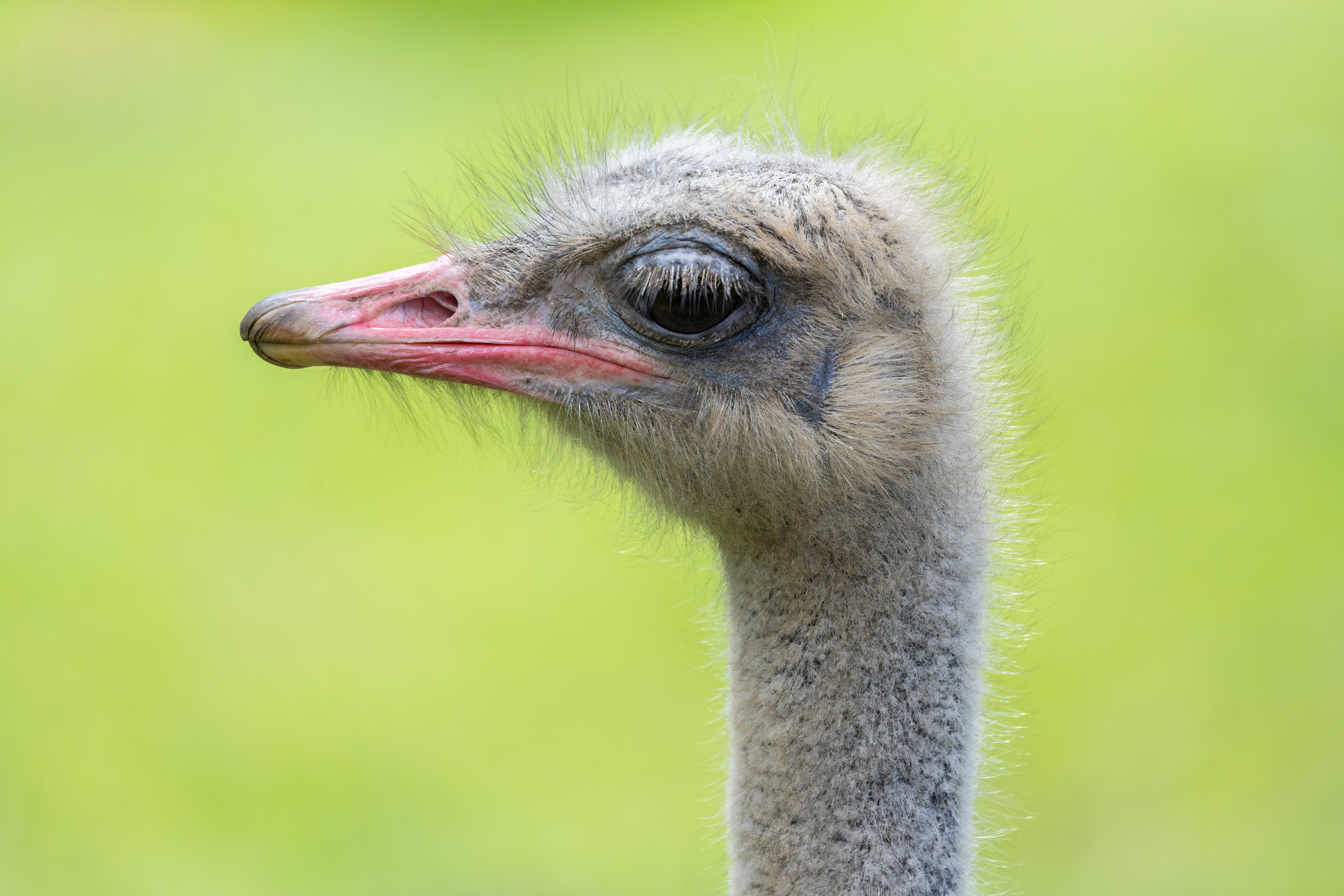
The head feathering consists of a thin layer of down.

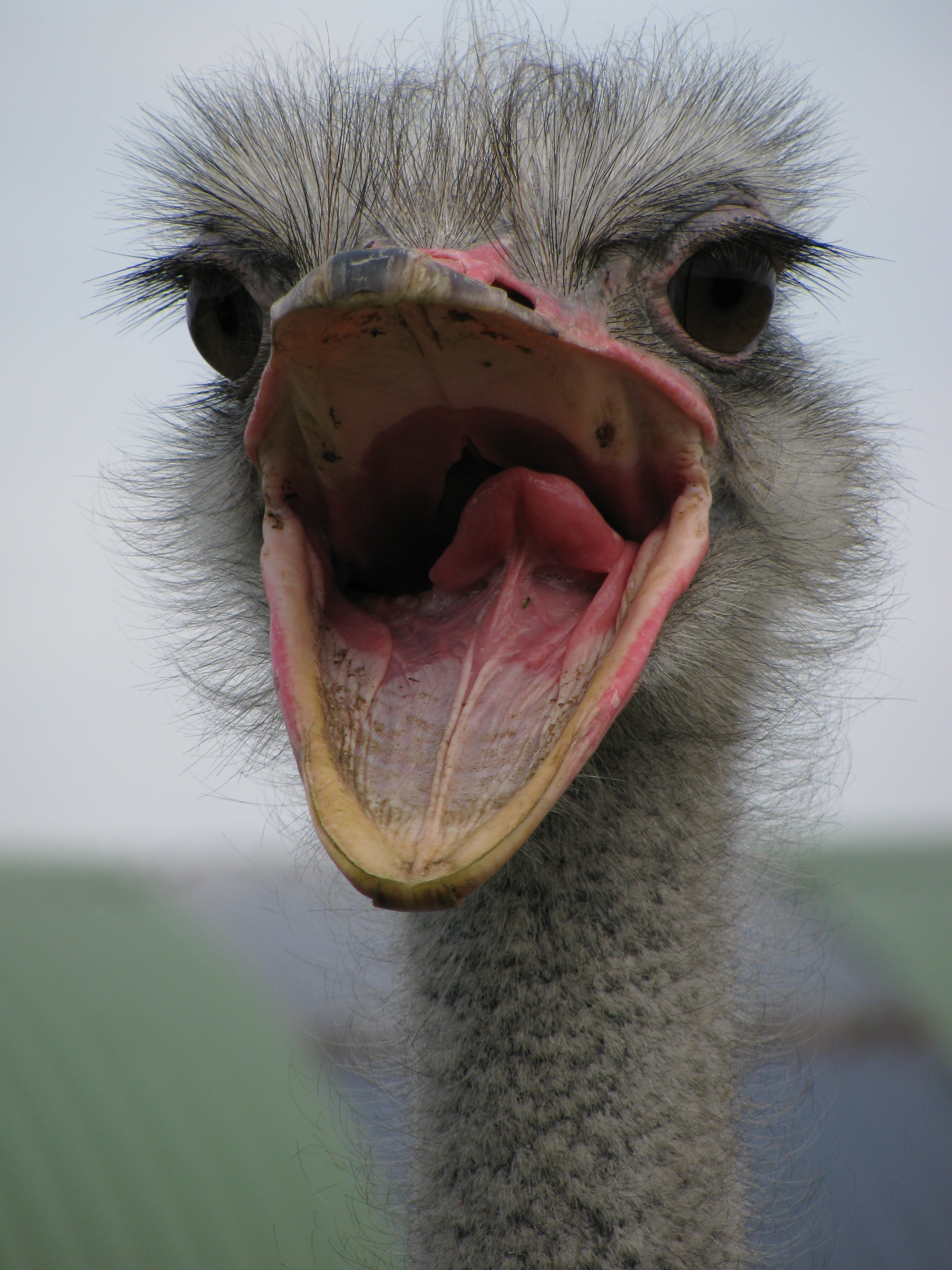
Long eyelashes protect the eyes.

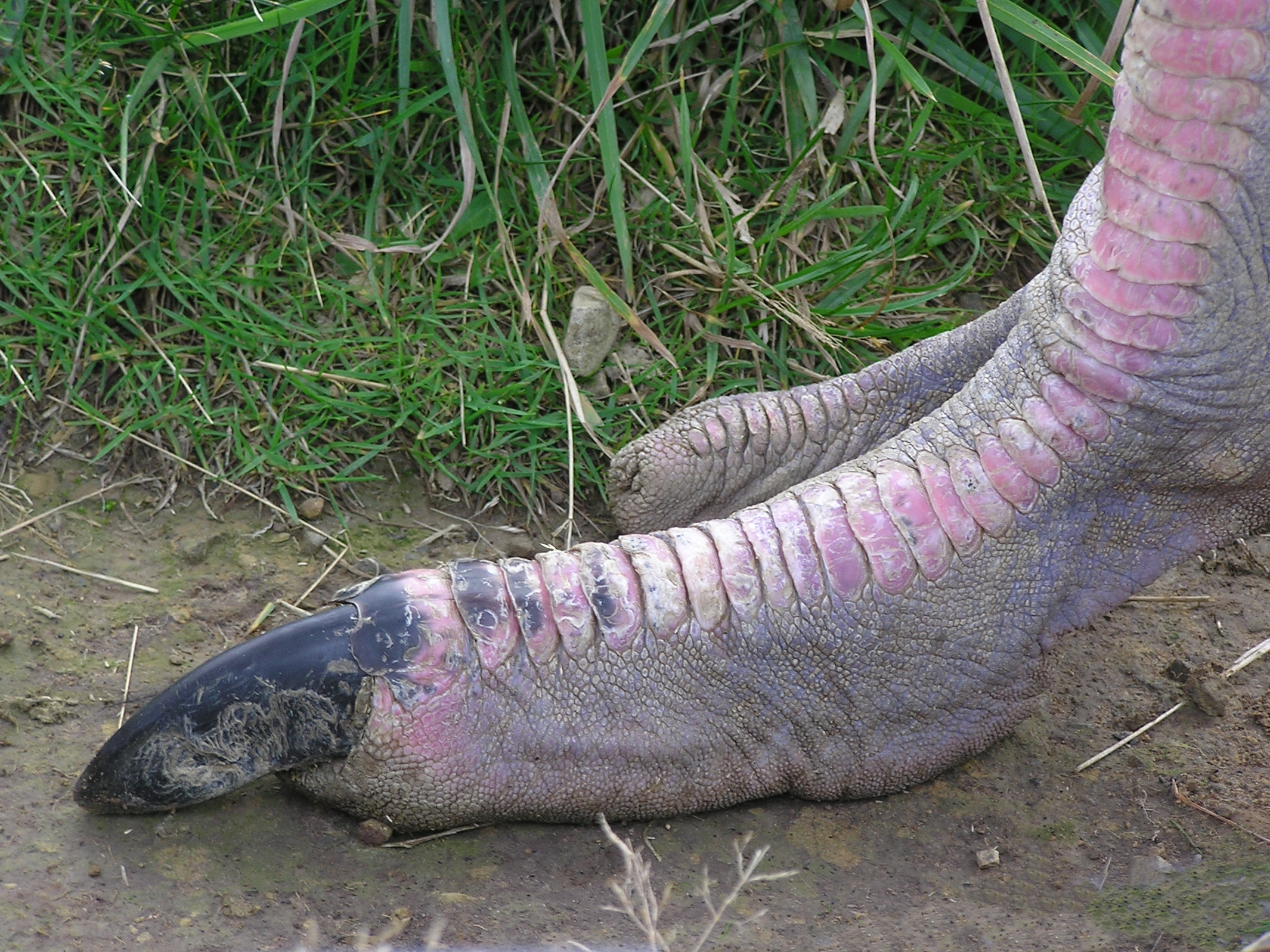
Feet are frequently missing the nail on the outer toe.

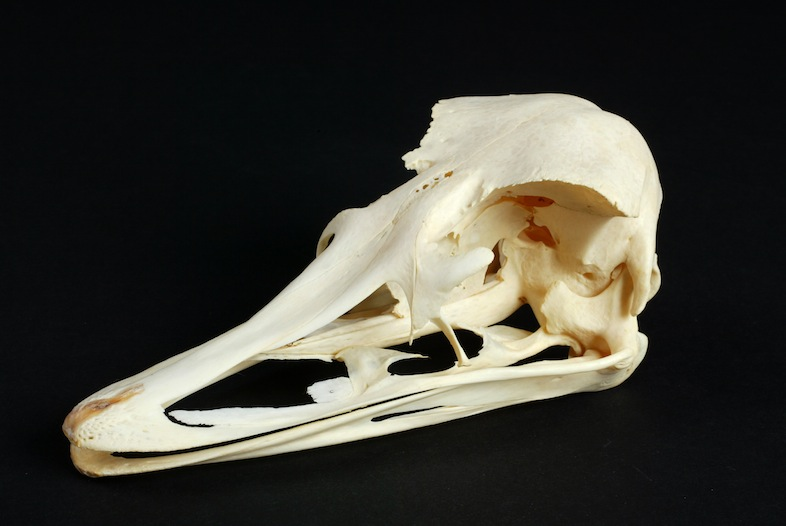
Skull

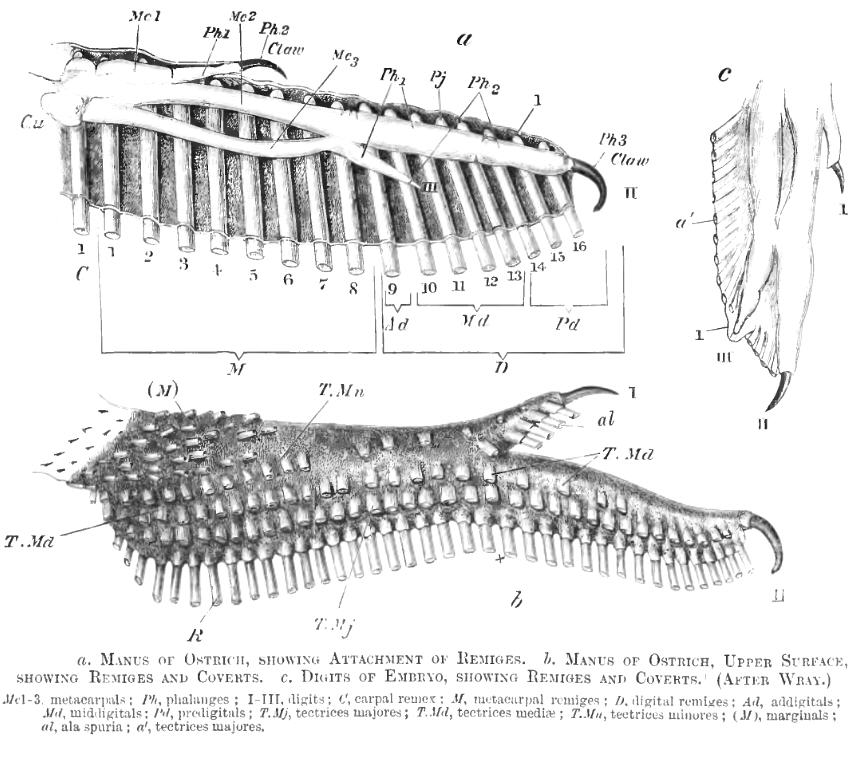
Claws on the wings

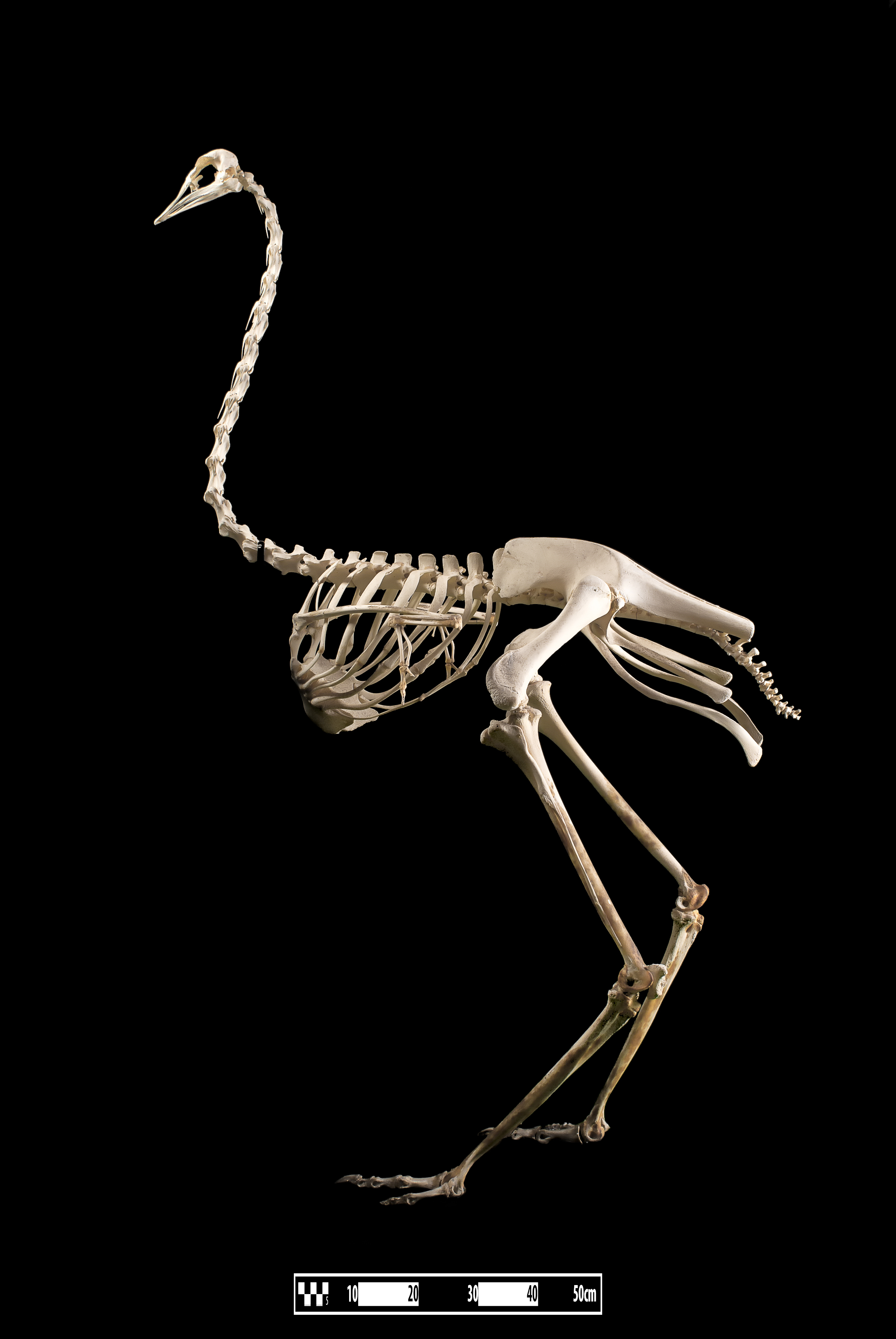

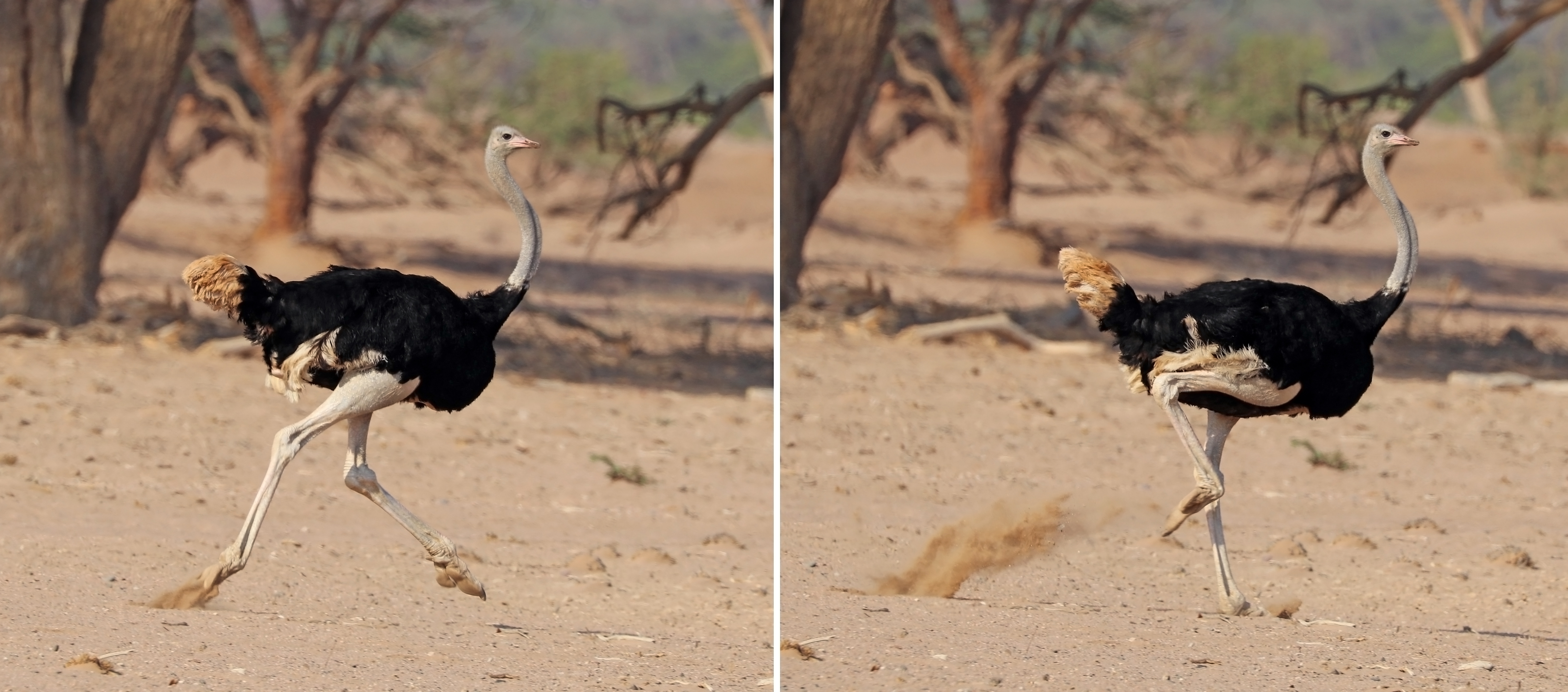
Male running, Namibia

The long neck and legs keep their head up to 2.8 m (9 ft 2 in) above the ground, and their eyes are the largest of any land vertebrate, 50 mm (2.0 in) in diameter, helping them to see predators at a great distance. The eyes are shaded from sunlight from above. However, the head and bill are relatively small for the birds' huge size, with the bill measuring 12 to 14.3 cm (4.7 to 5.6 in).

Their skin varies in colour depending on the subspecies, with some having light or dark grey skin and others having pinkish or even reddish skin. The strong legs of the common ostrich are unfeathered and show bare skin, with the tarsus (the lowest upright part of the leg) being covered in scales: red in the male, black in the female. The tarsus of the common ostrich is the largest of any living bird, measuring 39 to 53 cm (15 to 21 in) in length. The bird is didactyl, having just two toes on each foot (most birds have four), with the nail on the larger, inner toe resembling a hoof. The outer toe has no nail. The reduced number of toes is an adaptation that appears to aid in running, useful for getting away from predators. Common ostriches can run at a speed over 70 km/h (43 mph) and can cover 3 to 5 m (10 to 16 ft) in a single stride. The wings reach a span of about 2 m (6 ft 7 in), and the wing chord measurement of 90 cm (35 in) is around the same size as for the largest flying birds.

The feathers lack the tiny hooks that lock together the smooth external feathers of flying birds, and so are soft and fluffy and serve as insulation. Common ostriches can tolerate a wide range of temperatures. In much of their habitat, temperatures vary as much as 40 °C (72 °F) between night and day. Their temperature control relies in part on behavioural thermoregulation. For example, they use their wings to cover the naked skin of the upper legs and flanks to conserve heat, or leave these areas bare to release heat. The wings also function as stabilisers to give better maneuverability when running. Tests have shown that the wings are actively involved in rapid braking, turning, and zigzag maneuvers. They have 50–60 tail feathers, and their wings have 16 primary, four alular, and 20–23 secondary feathers.

The common ostrich's sternum is flat, lacking the keel to which wing muscles attach in flying birds. The beak is flat and broad, with a rounded tip. Like all ratites, the ostrich has no crop, and it also lacks a gallbladder and the caecum is 71 cm (28 in). Unlike all other living birds, the common ostrich secretes urine separately from faeces. All other birds store the urine and faeces combined in the coprodeum, but the ostrich stores the faeces in the terminal rectum. They also have unique pubic bones that are fused to hold their gut. Unlike most birds, the males have a copulatory organ, which is retractable and 20 cm (7.9 in) long. Their palate differs from other ratites in that the sphenoid and palatal bones are unconnected.

As the largest living bird, the common ostrich is thus also the largest living dinosaur. As a result, ostriches have been used as a comparison to study the biomechanics of extinct dinosaurs.

== Taxonomy ==
The common ostrich was originally described by Carl Linnaeus from Sweden in his 18th-century work, Systema Naturae under its current binomial name. Its genus is derived from the Late Latin struthio meaning "ostrich". The specific name is an allusion to "strouthokamelos" the Ancient Greek name for the ostrich, meaning camel-sparrow, the "camel" term referring to its dry habitat. Στρουθοκάμηλος is still the modern Greek name for the ostrich.

The common ostrich belongs to the Infraclass Palaeognathae, commonly known as ratites. Other members include rheas, emus, cassowaries, moa, kiwi, elephant birds, and tinamous.

=== Subspecies ===
Four subspecies are accepted:

Subspecies of the common ostrich
Subspecies	Description	Image
North African ostrich (S. c. camelus), also known as the red-necked ostrich or Barbary ostrich	Lives in North Africa. Historically it was the most widespread subspecies, ranging from Ethiopia and Sudan in the east throughout the Sahel to Senegal and Mauritania in the west, and north to Egypt and southern Morocco, respectively. It has now disappeared from large parts of this range, and it only remains in six of the 18 countries where it originally occurred, leading some to consider it Critically Endangered. It is the largest subspecies, at 2.74 m (9 ft 0 in) in height and up to 154 kg (340 lb) in weight. The neck is pinkish-red, the plumage of males is black and white, and the plumage of females is grey.: Northern Africa: Algeria, the Central African Republic, Chad, Egypt, Ethiopia, Libya, Mali, Mauritania, Morocco, Sudan, South Sudan, Togo, and Tunisia; Western Africa: Benin, Burkina Faso, Cameroon, Ghana, Niger, Nigeria, and Senegal	
South African ostrich (S. c. australis), also known as the black-necked ostrich, Cape ostrich, or southern ostrich	Found south of the Zambezi and Cunene Rivers. It is farmed for its meat, leather, and feathers in the Little Karoo area of Cape Province.: Southern Africa: Angola, Botswana, Democratic Republic of the Congo, Namibia, South Africa, Zambia, and Zimbabwe	
Masai ostrich (S. c. massaicus), also known as the pink-necked ostrich or East African ostrich	It has some small feathers on its head, and its neck and thighs are pink. During the mating season, the male's neck and thighs become brighter. Its range is essentially limited to southern Kenya and eastern Tanzania and Ethiopia and parts of southern Somalia.: Eastern Africa: Burundi, the Democratic Republic of the Congo, Ethiopia, Kenya, Rwanda, Somalia, Tanzania, and Uganda	
Arabian ostrich (†S. c. syriacus), also known as the Syrian ostrich or Middle Eastern ostrich	Was formerly very common in the Arabian Peninsula, Syria, Iraq, and Israeli Negev; it became extinct around 1966.: Western Asia: Iran, Iraq, Israel, Jordan, Kuwait, Oman, Qatar, Saudi Arabia, Syria, the United Arab Emirates, and Yemen	

Somali ostrich
Species	Description	Image
Somali ostrich (S. molybdophanes), also known as the blue-necked ostrich	Found in southern Ethiopia, northeastern Kenya, and Somalia. The neck and thighs are grey-blue, and during the mating season, the male's neck and thighs become brighter and bluer. The females are more brown than those of other subspecies. It generally lives in pairs or alone, rather than in flocks. Its range overlaps with S. c. massaicus in northeastern Kenya.: Northeastern Africa: Djibouti, Eritrea, Ethiopia, Kenya, and Somalia	

Some analyses indicate that the Somali ostrich is now considered a full species; the Tree of Life Project, The Clements Checklist of Birds of the World, BirdLife International, and the IOC World Bird List accept it as a different species. A few authorities, including the Howard and Moore Complete Checklist of the Birds of the World, do not accept it as separate. Mitochondrial DNA haplotype comparisons suggest that it diverged from the other ostriches around 4 mya due to the formation of the East African Rift. Hybridisation with the subspecies that evolved southwestward of its range, S. c. massaicus, has apparently been prevented from occurring on a significant scale by ecological separation; the Somali ostrich prefers bushland where it browses middle-height vegetation for food while the Masai ostrich is, like the other subspecies, a grazing bird of the open savanna and miombo habitat.

The population from Río de Oro was once separated as Struthio camelus spatzi because its eggshell pores were shaped like a teardrop and not round. As there is considerable variation of this character and there were no other differences between these birds and adjacent populations of S. c. camelus, the separation is no longer considered valid. However, a study analysing the postcranial skeleton of all living and recently extinct species and subspecies of ostriches appeared to validate S. c. spatzi based on its unique skeletal proportions. This population disappeared in the latter half of the 20th century. There were 19th-century reports of the existence of small ostriches in North Africa; these are referred to as Levaillant's ostrich (Struthio bidactylus) but remain a hypothetical form not supported by material evidence.

== Distribution and habitat ==
Common ostriches formerly occupied Africa north and south of the Sahara, East Africa, Africa south of the rainforest belt, and much of Asia Minor. Today common ostriches prefer open land and are native to the savannas and Sahel of Africa, both north and south of the equatorial forest zone. In southwest Africa they inhabit the semi-desert or true desert. Farmed common ostriches in Australia have established feral populations. The Arabian ostriches in the Near and Middle East were hunted to extinction by the middle of the 20th century. Attempts to reintroduce the common ostrich into Israel have failed. Common ostriches have occasionally been seen inhabiting islands on the Dahlak Archipelago, in the Red Sea near Eritrea.

Research conducted by the Birbal Sahni Institute of Palaeobotany in India found molecular evidence that ostriches lived in India 25,000 years ago. DNA tests on fossilised eggshells recovered from eight archaeological sites in the states of Rajasthan, Gujarat, and Madhya Pradesh found 92% genetic similarity between the eggshells and the North African ostrich, so these could have been fairly distant relatives.

Ostriches were introduced to Australia for farming, and a small feral population now exists in the Australian outback.

== Behaviour and ecology ==
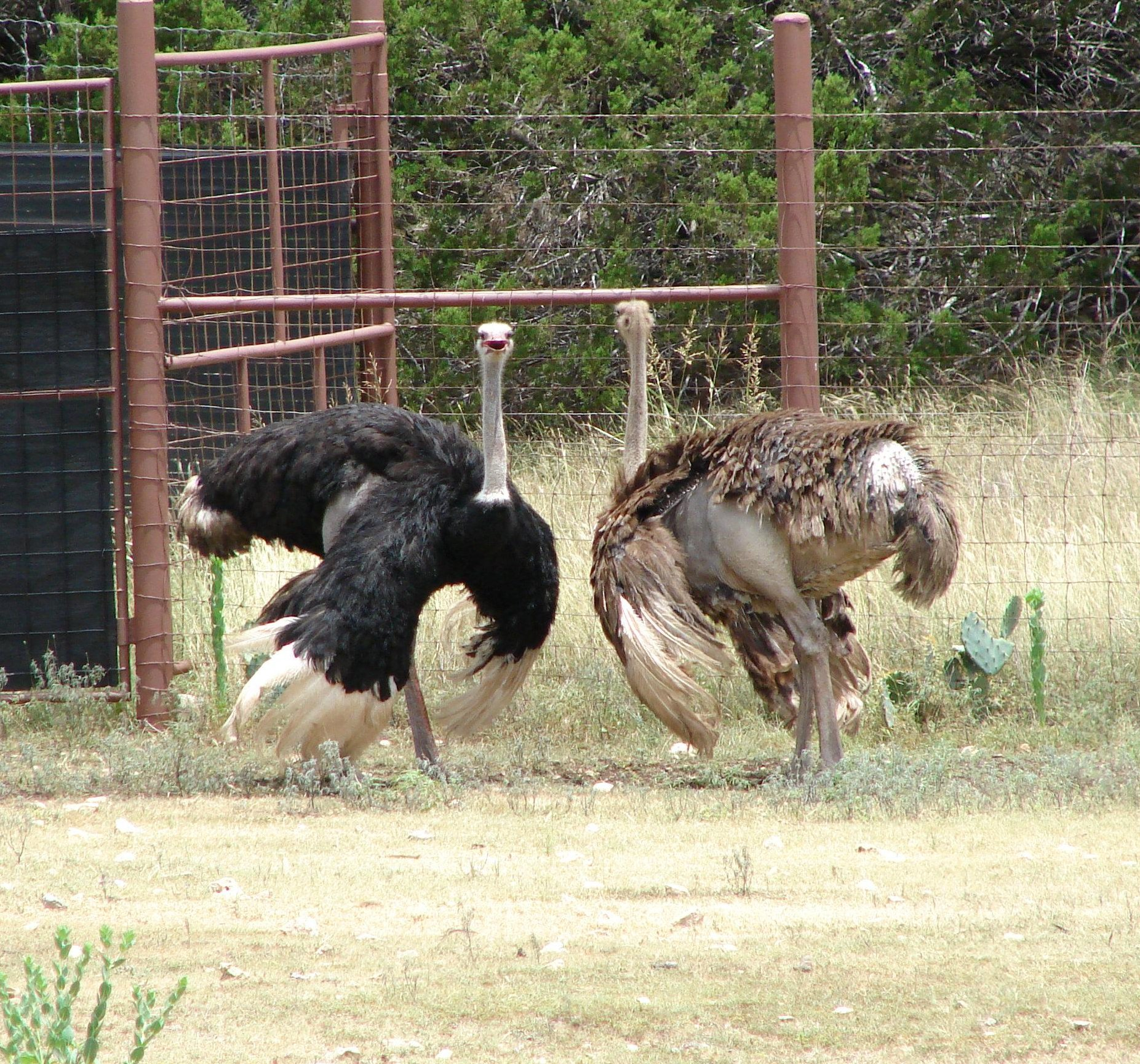
Two birds "dancing"

Sleeping, with REM sleep and slow-wave sleep phases

Common ostriches normally spend the winter months in pairs or alone. Only 16 percent of common ostrich sightings were of more than two birds. During breeding season and sometimes during extreme rainless periods ostriches live in nomadic groups of five to 100 birds (led by a top hen) that often travel together with other grazing animals, such as zebras or antelopes. Ostriches are diurnal, but may be active on moonlit nights. They are most active early and late in the day. The male common ostrich territory is between 2 and 20 km^{2} (0.77 and 7.72 sq mi).

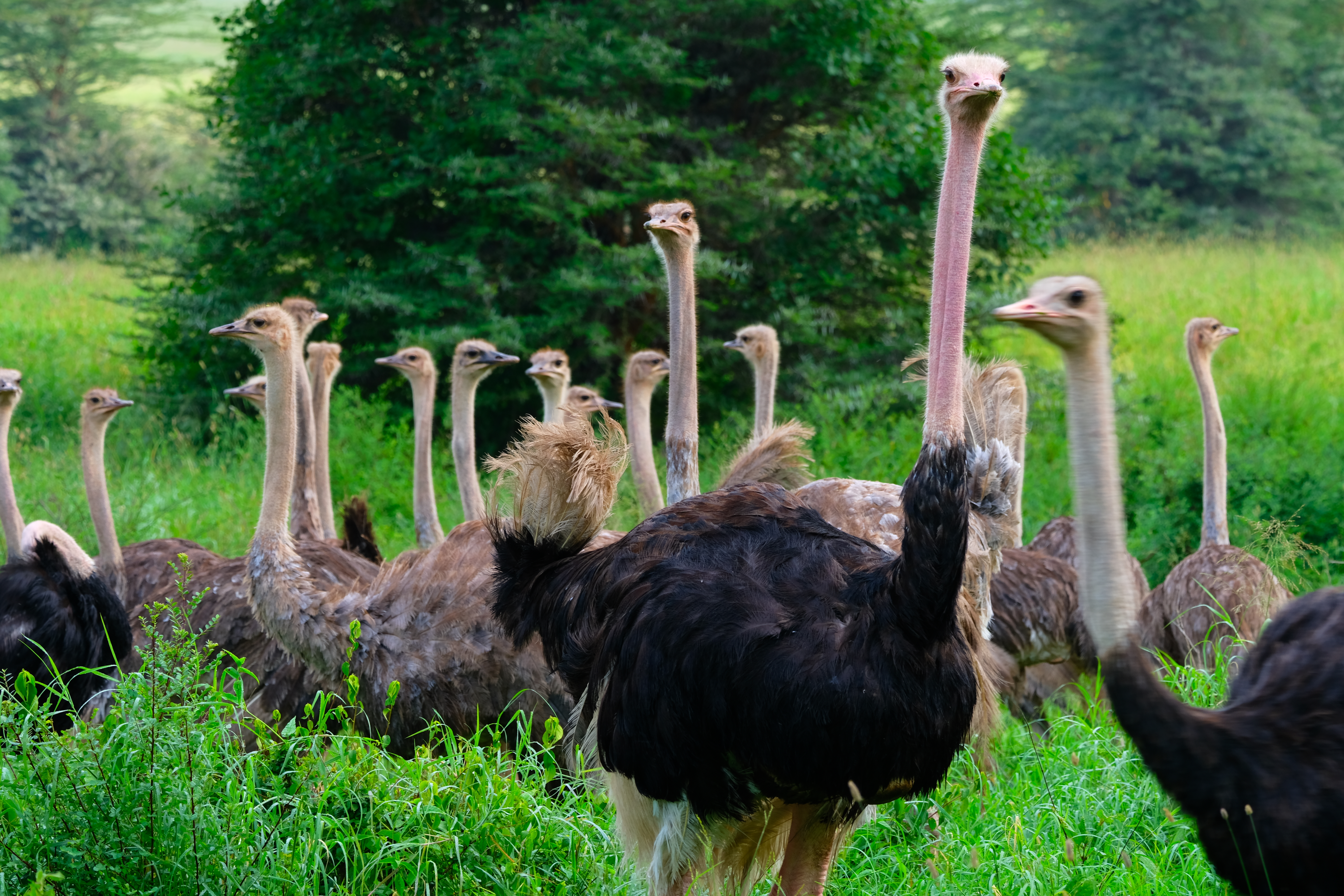
A large group of around 30 ostriches gathered in Nairobi National Park, Kenya.

With their acute eyesight and hearing, common ostriches can sense predators such as lions from far away. When being pursued by a predator, they have been known to reach speeds in excess of 70 km/h (43 mph), or possibly 80 km/h (50 mph) and can maintain a steady speed of 50 km/h (31 mph), which makes the common ostrich the fastest bipedal animal. When lying down and hiding from predators, the birds lay their heads and necks flat on the ground, making them appear like a mound of earth from a distance, aided by the heat haze in their hot, dry habitat.

When threatened, common ostriches run away, but they can cause serious injury and death with kicks from their powerful legs. Their legs can only kick forward. The kick from an ostrich can yield 225 kgf (2,210 N; 500 lbf).

=== Feeding ===
They mainly feed on seeds, shrubs, grass, fruit, and flowers; occasionally they also eat insects such as locusts, rodents such as mice, small reptiles such as lizards, and animal remains left by carnivorous predators. Lacking teeth, they swallow pebbles that act as gastroliths to grind food in the gizzard. When eating, they will fill their gullet with food, which is in turn passed down their oesophagus in the form of a ball called a bolus. The bolus may be as much as 210 mL (7.4 imp fl oz; 7.1 US fl oz). After passing through the neck (there is no crop) the food enters the gizzard and is worked on by the aforementioned pebbles. The gizzard can hold as much as 1,300 g (46 oz), of which up to 45% may be sand and pebbles. Common ostriches can go without drinking for several days, using metabolic water and moisture in ingested plants, but they enjoy liquid water and frequently take baths where it is available. They can survive losing up to 25% of their body weight through dehydration.

=== Mating ===
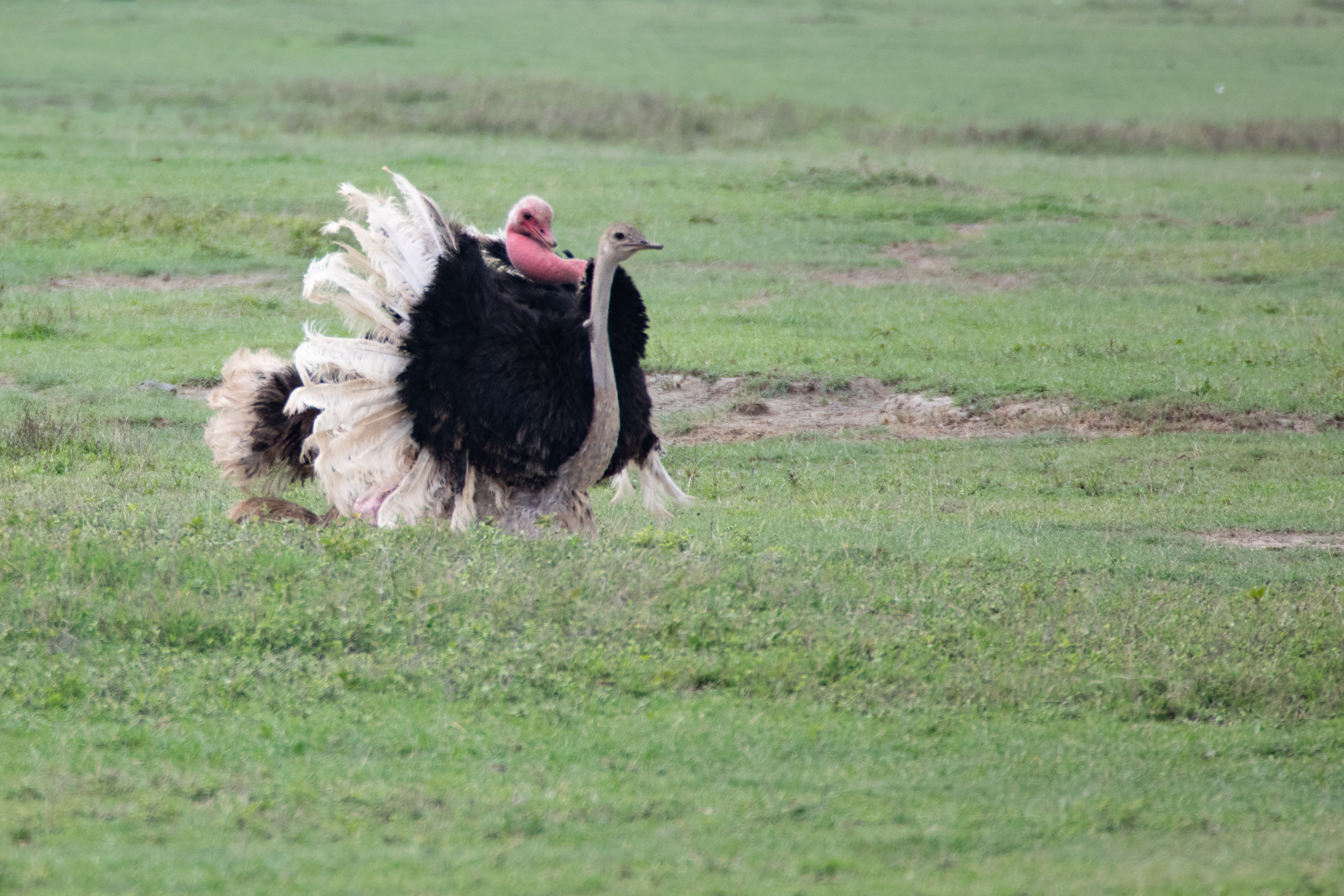
Mating in Ngorongoro Conservation Area

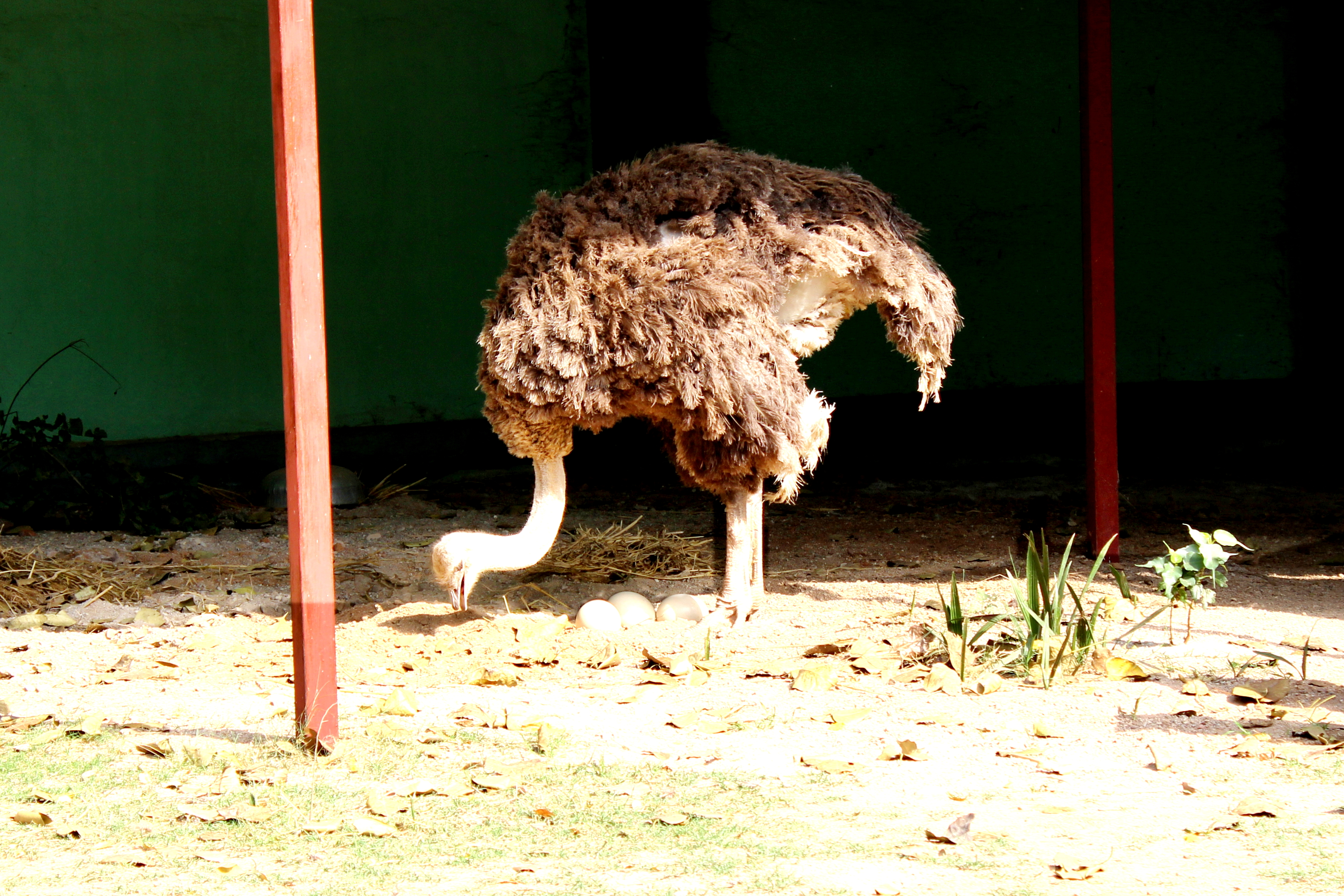
With eggs

Common ostriches become sexually mature when they are 2 to 4 years old; females mature about six months earlier than males. As with other birds, an individual may reproduce several times over its lifetime. The mating season begins in March or April and ends sometime before September. The mating process differs in different geographical regions. Territorial males typically boom (by inflating their neck) in defence of their territory and harem of two to seven hens; the successful male may then mate with several females in the area, but will only form a pair bond with a 'major' female.

The cock performs with his wings, alternating wing beats, until he attracts a mate. They will go to the mating area and he will maintain privacy by driving away all intruders. They graze until their behaviour is synchronised, then the feeding becomes secondary and the process takes on a ritualistic appearance. The cock will then excitedly flap alternate wings again and start poking on the ground with his bill. He will then violently flap his wings to symbolically clear out a nest in the soil. Then, while the hen runs a circle around him with lowered wings, he will wind his head in a spiral motion. She will drop to the ground and he will mount for copulation. Common ostriches raised entirely by humans may direct their courtship behaviour not at other ostriches, but toward their human keepers.

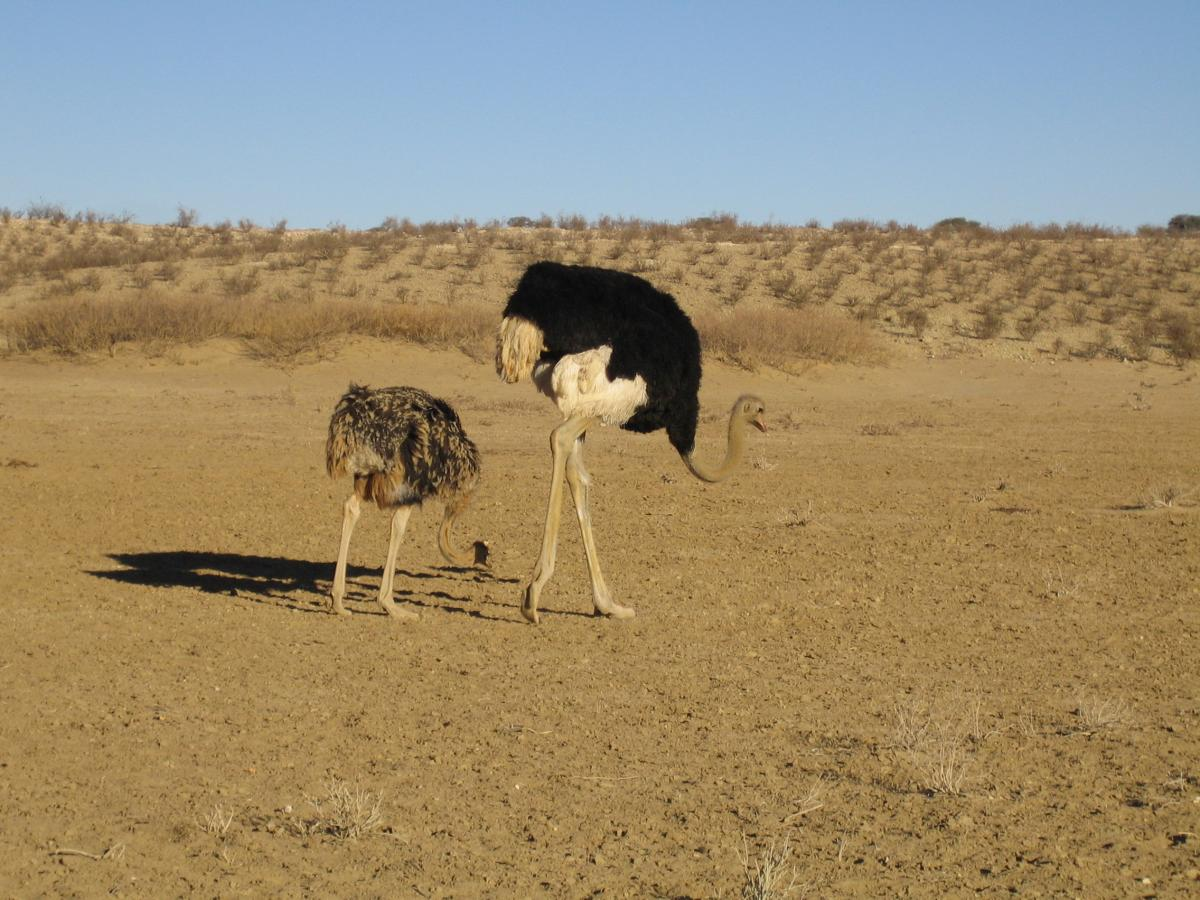
Only 15% of hatchling chicks reach 1 year of age.

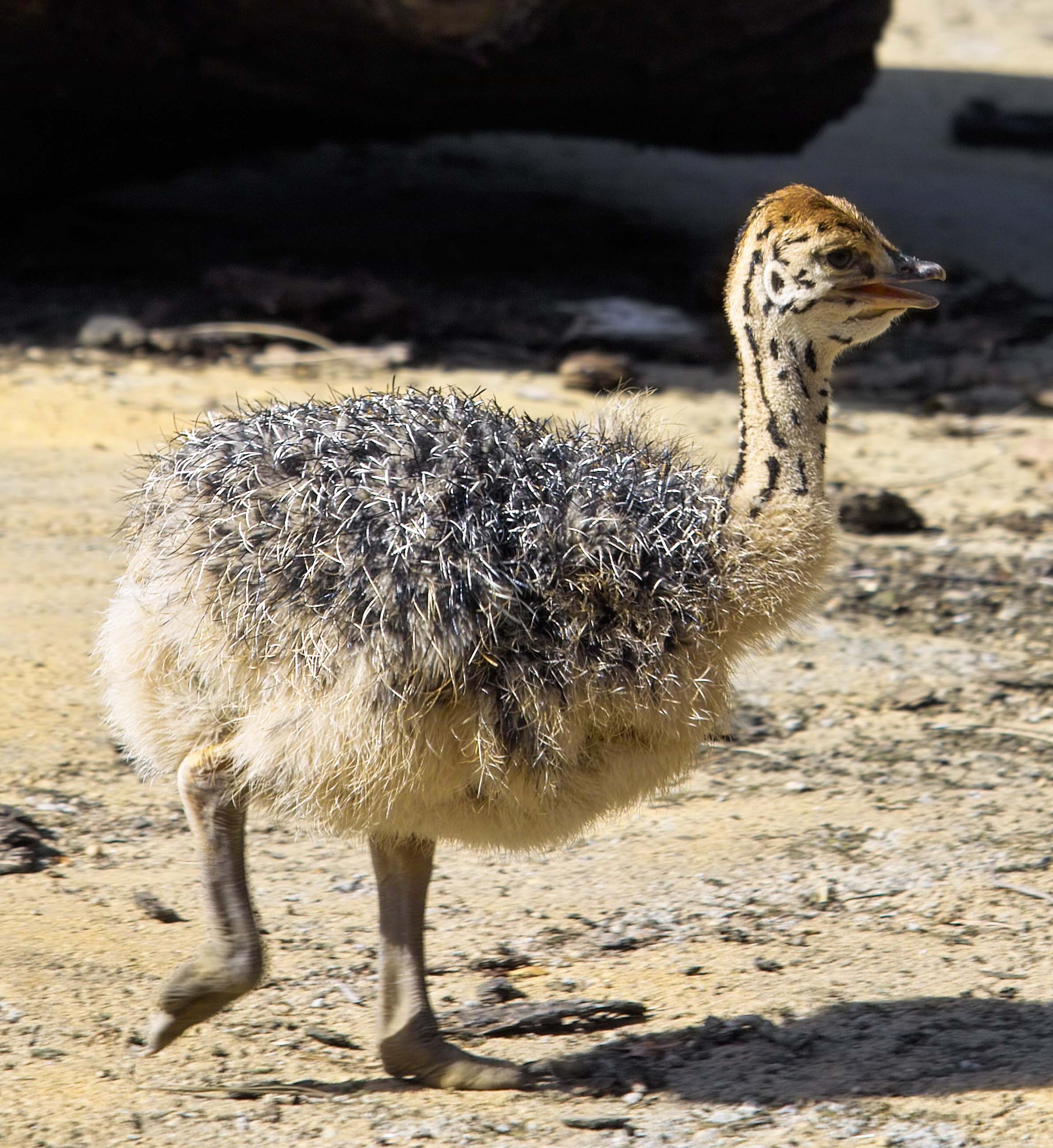
Chick

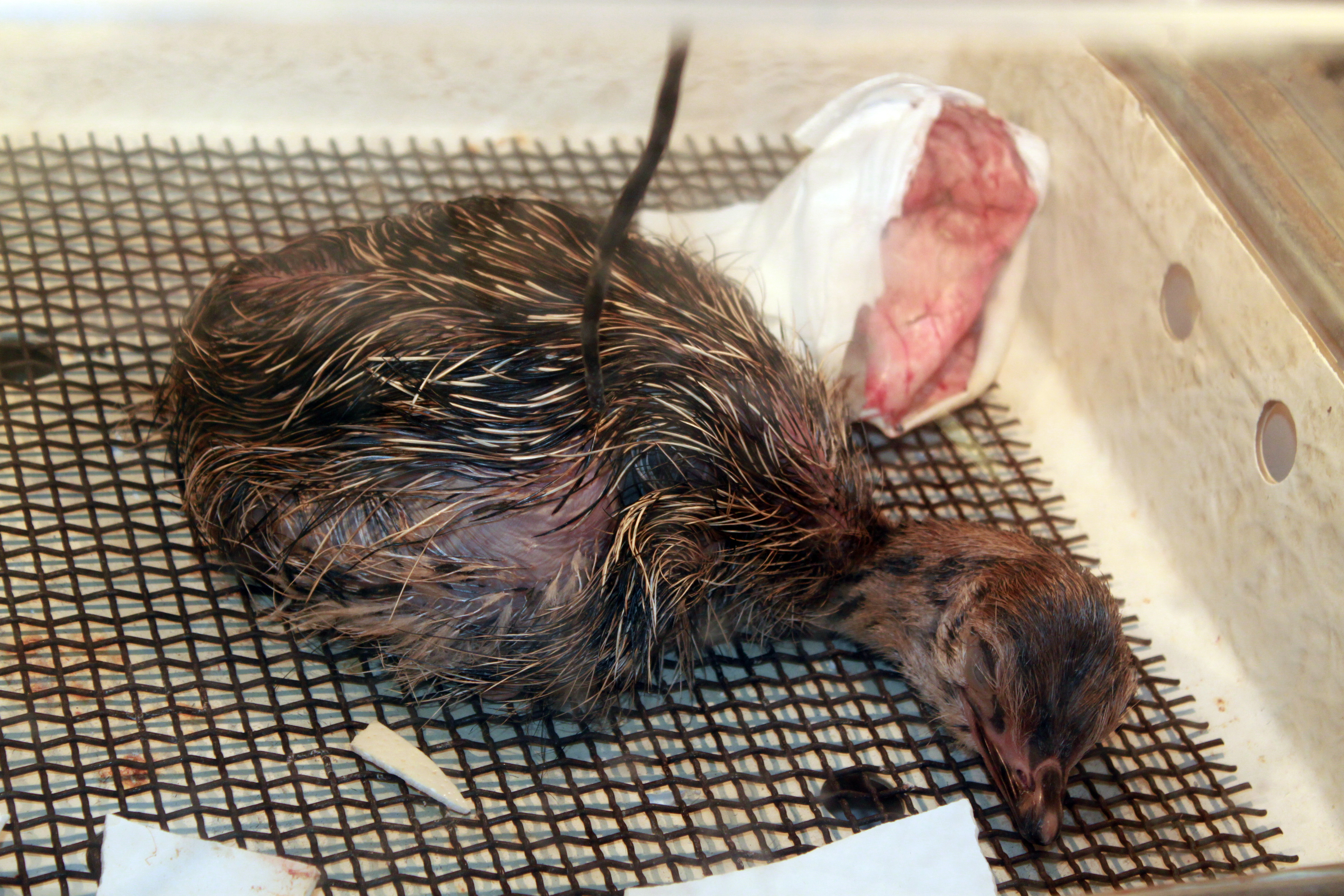
Recently hatched from egg

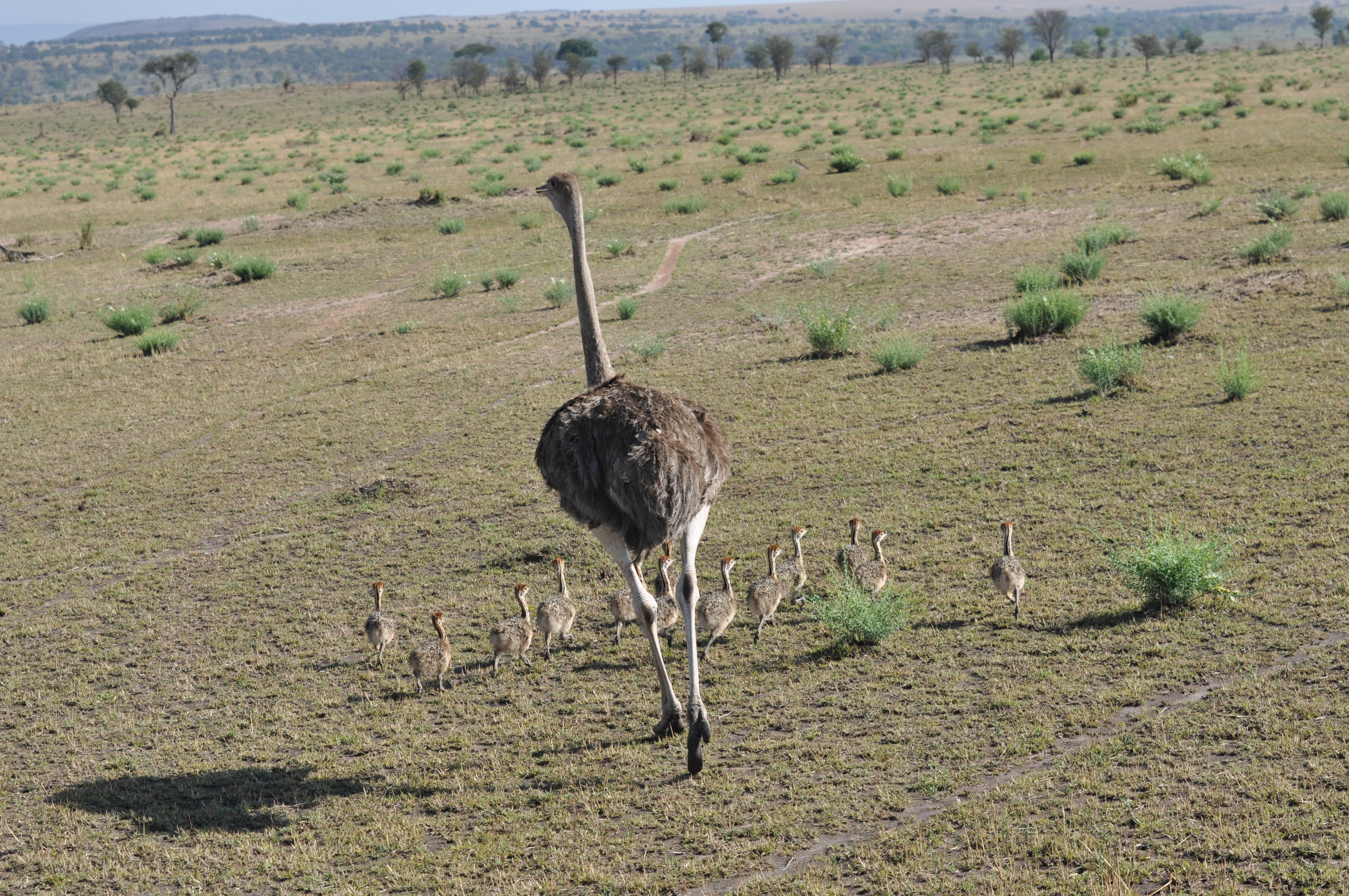
Hen with chicks

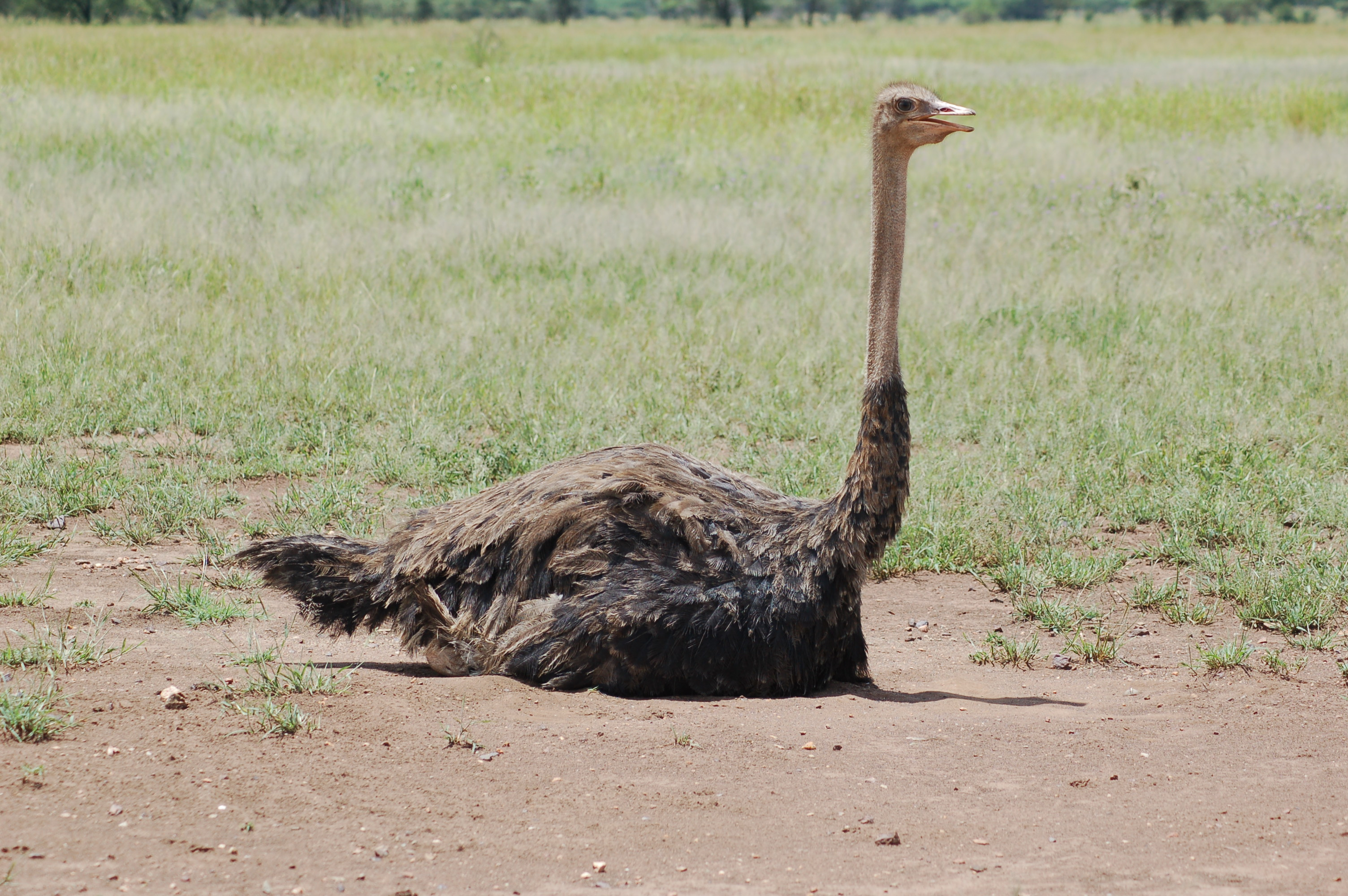
Female incubating eggs

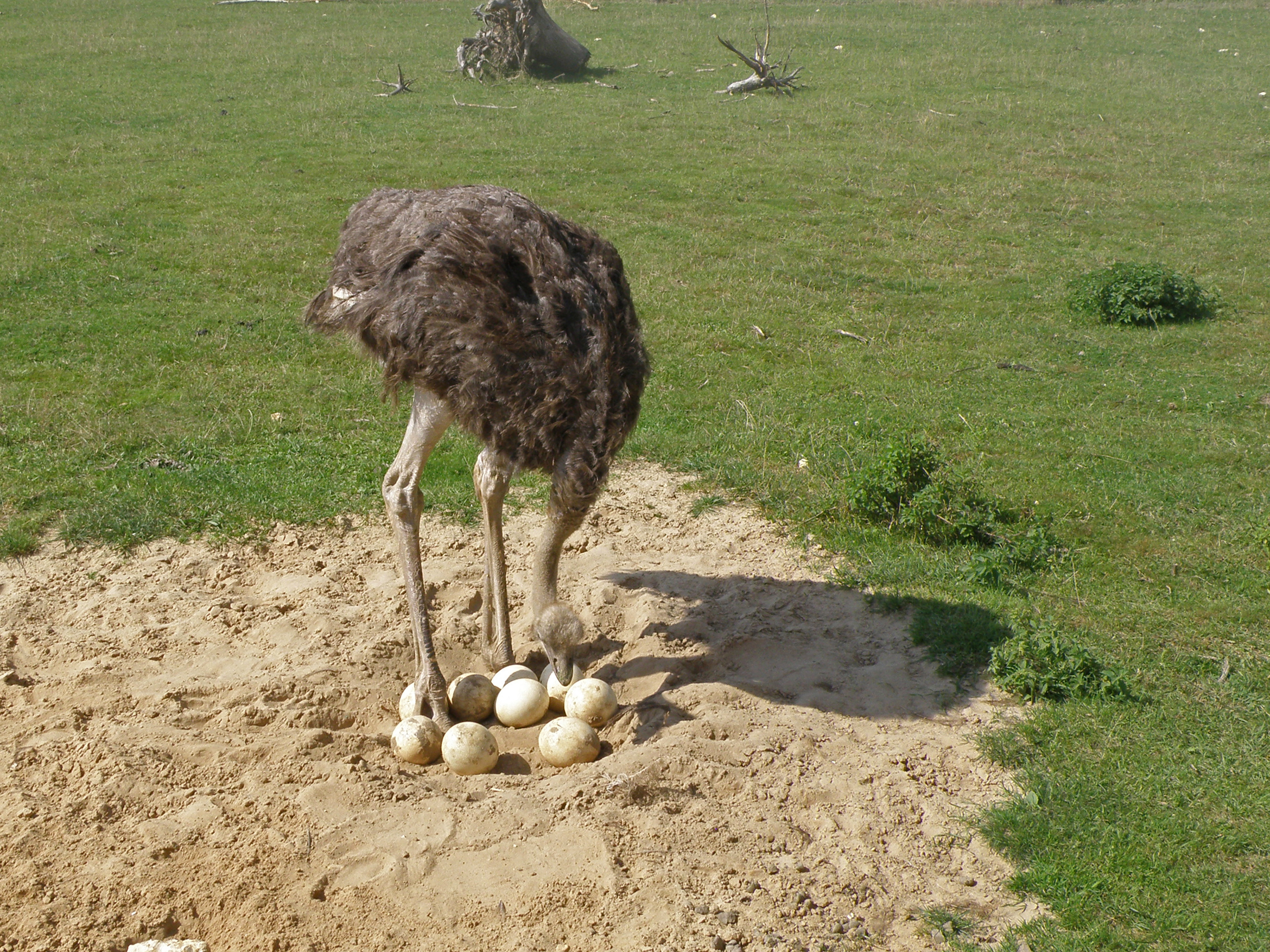
Nest

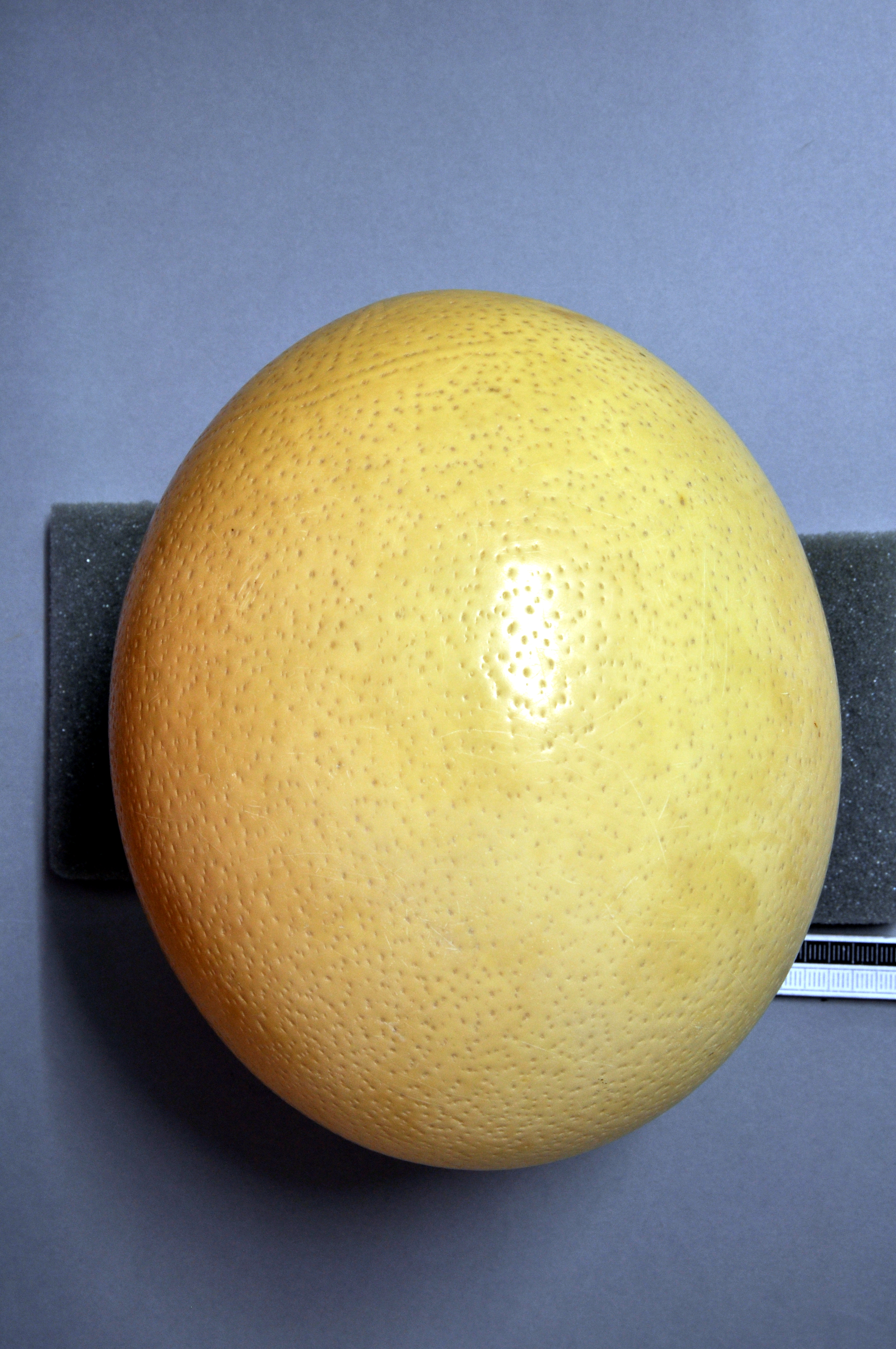

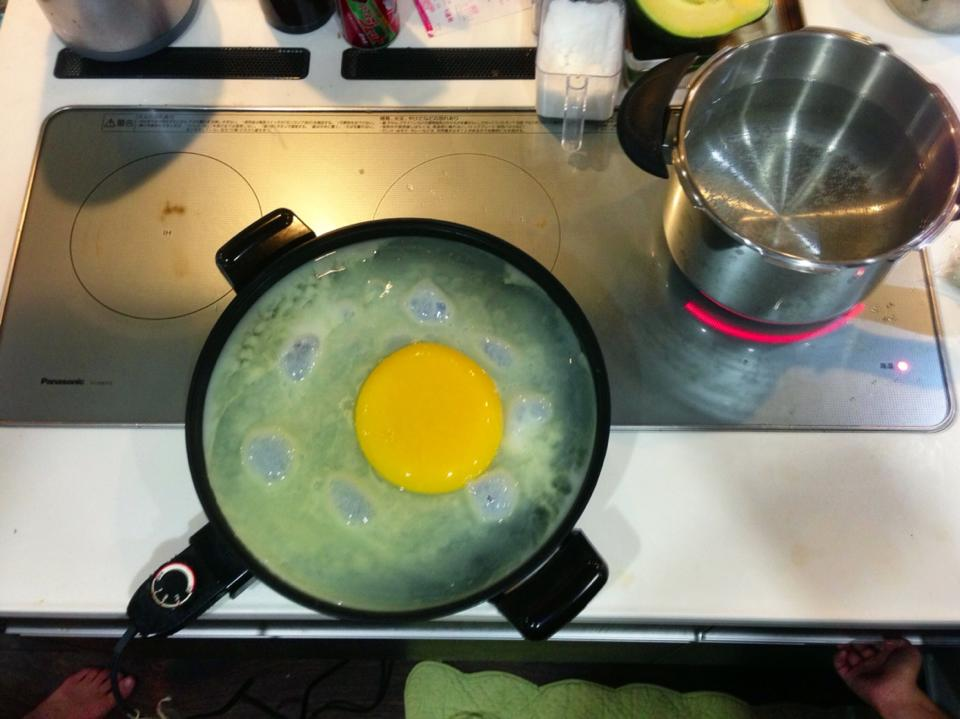

The female common ostrich lays her fertilised eggs in a single communal nest, a simple pit, 30 to 60 cm (12 to 24 in) deep and 3 m (9.8 ft) wide, scraped in the ground by the male. The dominant female lays her eggs first; when it is time to cover them for incubation, she discards extra eggs from the weaker females, leaving about 20 in most cases. A female common ostrich can distinguish her own eggs from the others in a communal nest. Ostrich eggs are the largest of all eggs, though they are actually the smallest eggs relative to the size of the adult bird – on average they are 15 cm (5.9 in) long, 13 cm (5.1 in) wide, and weigh 1.4 kg (3.1 lb), over 20 times the weight of a chicken's egg and only 1 to 4% the size of the female. They are glossy cream-coloured, with thick shells marked by small pits.

The eggs are incubated by the females by day and by the males by night. This uses the colour of the two sexes to escape detection of the nest. The drab female blends in with the sand, while the black male is nearly undetectable in the night. The incubation period is 35 to 45 days, which is rather short compared to other ratites. This is believed to be the case due to the high rate of predation. Typically, the male defends the hatchlings and teaches them to feed, although males and females cooperate in rearing chicks. Fewer than 10% of nests survive the 9-week period of laying and incubation, and of the surviving chicks, only 15% of those survive to 1 year old. However, among those common ostriches which survive to adulthood, the species is one of the longest-living bird species. Common ostriches in captivity have lived to 62 years and 7 months.

=== Predators ===
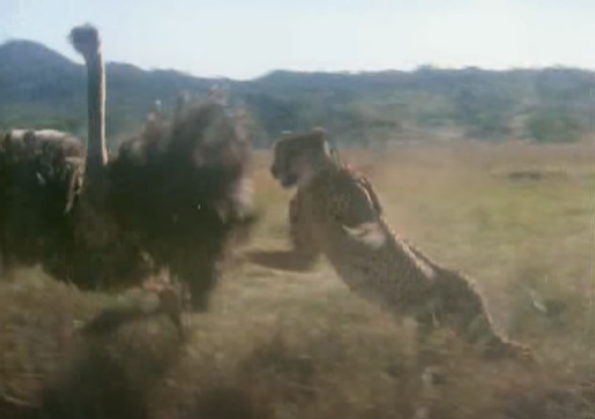
Young female chased by a cheetah

As a flightless species in the rich biozone of the African savanna, the common ostrich faces a variety of formidable predators throughout its life cycle. Animals that prey on ostriches of all ages may include cheetahs, lions, leopards, African hunting dogs, and spotted hyenas. Predators of nests and young common ostriches include jackals, various birds of prey, warthogs, mongoose, and Egyptian vultures. Egyptian vultures have been known to hurl stones at ostrich eggs to crack them open so they can eat their contents.

Due to predation pressure, common ostriches have many antipredator tactics. Though they can deliver formidable kicks, they use their great eyesight and speed to run from most of their predators. Since ostriches that have detected predators are almost impossible to catch, most predators will try to ambush an unsuspecting bird using obstructing vegetation or other objects. Some ostriches forage with other ostriches or mammals such as wildebeests and zebras to detect predators more efficiently. If the nest or young are threatened, either or both of the parents may create a distraction, feigning injury. However, they may sometimes fiercely fight predators, especially when chicks are being defended, and are capable of killing humans, hyenas, and even lions in such confrontations. In non-native areas, especially on ostrich farms in North America, adult ostriches have no known enemies due to their large size, intimidating presence, and behaviour similar to that of overgrown guard dogs, with instances of them attacking and decapitating coyotes on one occasion.

Usually, ostrich hunting is done by male cheetah coalitions in the Kalahari region during the night, when ostrich's vigilance is less effective. Cheetahs in other regions rarely hunt ostriches, but an exceptional coalition composed of three East African cheetahs has been reported in Kenya. Similarly, lions hunt ostriches mainly in the Kalahari region and not in other regions, or take ostriches as only a small percentage of their prey. Overall, due to their speed, vigilance, and possibly dangerous kick, ostriches are usually avoided by most predators, including lions, leopards, wild dogs, and cheetahs. Despite parental care, 90% is typical for chick mortality, most of it caused by predation.

== Physiology ==
=== Respiration ===
==== Anatomy ====
Diagrammatic location of the air sacs

Morphology of the common ostrich lung indicates that the structure conforms to that of the other avian species, but still retains parts of its primitive ratite structure. The opening to the respiratory pathway begins with the laryngeal cavity lying posterior to the choanae within the buccal cavity. The tip of the tongue then lies anterior to the choanae, excluding the nasal respiratory pathway from the buccal cavity. The trachea lies ventrally to the cervical vertebrae extending from the larynx to the syrinx, where the trachea enters the thorax, dividing into two primary bronchi, one to each lung, in which they continue directly through to become mesobronchi. Ten different air sacs attach to the lungs to form areas for respiration. The most posterior air sacs (abdominal and post-thoracic) differ in that the right abdominal air sac is relatively small, lying to the right of the mesentery, and dorsally to the liver. While the left abdominal air sac is large and lies to the left of the mesentery. The connection from the main mesobronchi to the more anterior air sacs including the interclavicular, lateral clavicular, and pre-thoracic sacs known as the ventrobronchi region. While the caudal end of the mesobronchus branches into several dorsobronchi. Together, the ventrobronchi and dorsobronchi are connected by intra-pulmonary airways, the parabronchi, which form an arcade structure within the lung called the paleopulmo. It is the only structure found in primitive birds such as ratites.

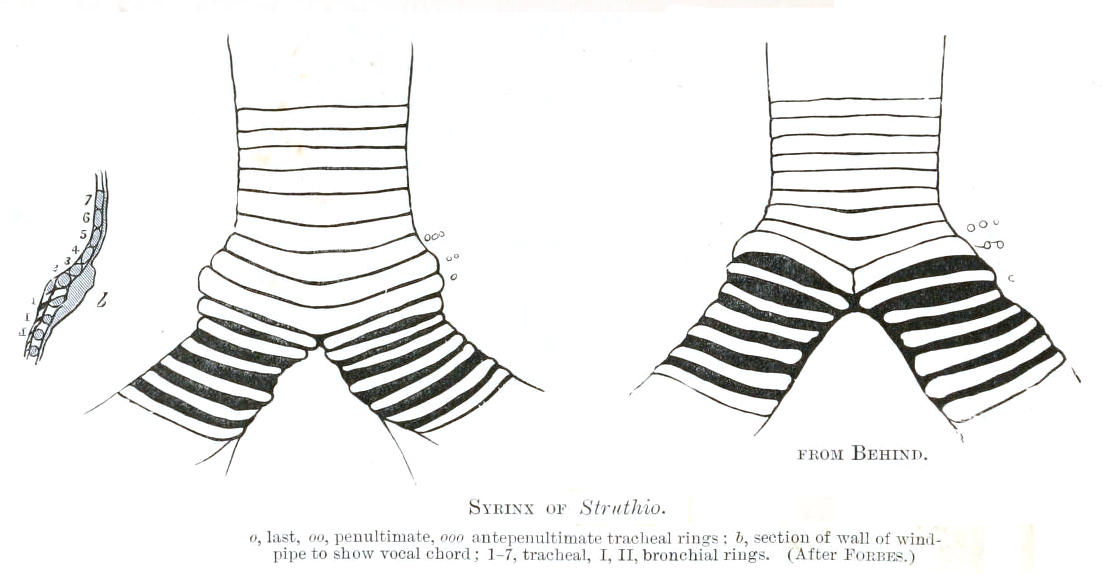
The syrinx has simple muscles. The only sounds that can be produced are roars and hisses.

The largest air sacs found within the respiratory system are those of the post-thoracic region, while the others decrease in size respectively, the interclavicular (unpaired), abdominal, pre-thoracic, and lateral clavicular sacs. The adult common ostrich lung lacks connective tissue known as interparabronchial septa, which render strength to the non-compliant avian lung in other bird species. Due to this the lack of connective tissue surrounding the parabronchi and adjacent parabronchial lumen, they exchange blood capillaries or avascular epithelial plates. Like mammals, ostrich lungs contain an abundance of type II cells at gas exchange sites; an adaptation for preventing lung collapse during slight volume changes.

==== Function ====
The common ostrich is an endotherm and maintains a body temperature of 38.1–39.7 °C (100.6–103.5 °F) in its extreme living temperature conditions, such as the heat of the savanna and desert regions of Africa. The ostrich uses its respiratory system via a costal pump for ventilation rather than a diaphragmatic pump as seen in most mammals. Thus, they are able to use a series of air sacs connected to the lungs. The use of air sacs forms the basis for the three main avian respiratory characteristics:

1. Air is able to flow continuously in one direction through the lung, making it more efficient than the mammalian lung.
2. It provides birds with a large residual volume, allowing them to breathe much more slowly and deeply than a mammal of the same body mass.
3. It provides a large source of air that is used not only for gaseous exchange, but also for the transfer of heat by evaporation.

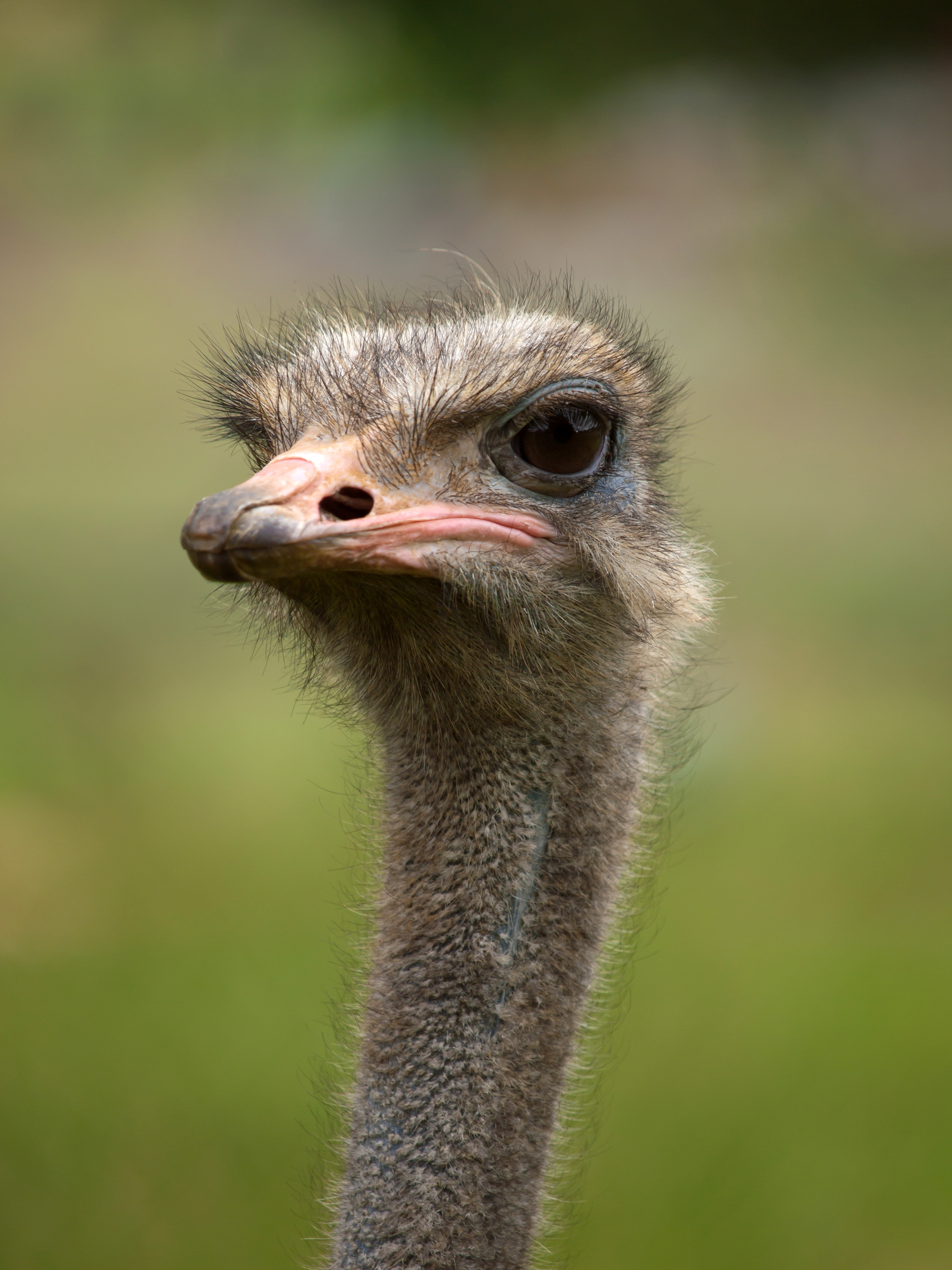

Inhalation begins at the mouth and the nostrils located at the front of the beak. The air then flows through the anatomical dead space of a highly vascular trachea (c. 78 cm (31 in)) and expansive bronchial system, where it is further conducted to the posterior air sacs. Air flow through the parabronchi of the paleopulmo is in the same direction to the dorsobronchi during inspiration and expiration. Inspired air moves into the respiratory system as a result of the expansion of thoraco abdominal cavity; controlled by inspiratory muscles. During expiration, oxygen poor air flows to the anterior air sacs and is expelled by the action of the expiratory muscles. The common ostrich air sacs play a key role in respiration, since they are capacious, and increase surface area (as described by the Fick Principle). The oxygen rich air flows unidirectionally across the respiratory surface of the lungs; providing the blood that has a crosscurrent flow with a high concentration of oxygen.

To compensate for the large "dead" space, the common ostrich trachea lacks valves to allow faster inspiratory air flow. In addition, the total lung capacity of the respiratory system, (including the lungs and ten air sacs) of a 100 kg (220 lb) ostrich is about 15 L (920 cu in), with a tidal volume ranging from 1.2–1.5 L (73–92 cu in). The tidal volume is seen to double resulting in a 16-fold increase in ventilation. Overall, ostrich respiration can be thought of as a high velocity-low pressure system. At rest, there is a small pressure difference between the ostrich air sacs and the atmosphere, suggesting simultaneous filling and emptying of the air sacs.

The increase in respiration rate from the low range to the high range is sudden and occurs in response to hyperthermia. Birds lack sweat glands, so when placed under stress due to heat, they heavily rely upon increased evaporation from the respiratory system for heat transfer. This rise in respiration rate however is not necessarily associated with a greater rate of oxygen consumption. Therefore, unlike most other birds, the common ostrich is able to dissipate heat through panting without experiencing respiratory alkalosis by modifying ventilation of the respiratory medium. During hyperpnea ostriches pant at a respiratory rate of 40–60 cycles per minute, versus their resting rate of 6–12 cycles per minute. Hot, dry, and moisture lacking properties of the common ostrich respiratory medium affect oxygen's diffusion rate (Henry's Law).

Common ostriches develop via intussusceptive angiogenesis, a mechanism of blood vessel formation, characterising many organs. It is not only involved in vasculature expansion, but also in angioadaptation of vessels to meet physiological requirements. The use of such mechanisms demonstrates an increase in the later stages of lung development, along with elaborate parabronchial vasculature, and reorientation of the gas exchange blood capillaries to establish the crosscurrent system at the blood–gas barrier. The blood–gas barrier (BGB) of their lung tissue is thick. The advantage of this thick barrier may be protection from damage by large volumes of blood flow in times of activity, such as running, since air is pumped by the air sacs rather than the lung itself. As a result, the capillaries in the parabronchi have thinner walls, permitting more efficient gaseous exchange. In combination with separate pulmonary and systemic circulatory systems, it helps to reduce stress on the BGB.

=== Circulation ===
==== Heart anatomy ====
The common ostrich heart is a closed system, contractile chamber. It is composed of myogenic muscular tissue associated with heart contraction features. There is a double circulatory plan in place possessing both a pulmonary circuit and systemic circuit.

The common ostrich's heart has similar features to other avian species, like having a conically shaped heart and being enclosed by a pericardium layer. Moreover, similarities also include a larger right atrium volume and a thicker left ventricle to fulfil the systemic circuit. The ostrich heart has three features that are absent in related birds:

1. The right atrioventricular valve is fixed to the interventricular septum, by a thick muscular stock, which prevents back-flow of blood into the atrium when ventricular systole is occurring. In the fowl this valve is only connected by a short septal attachment.
2. Pulmonary veins attach to the left atrium separately, and also the opening to the pulmonary veins are separated by a septum.
3. Moderator bands, full of Purkinje fibres, are found in different locations in the left and right ventricles. These bands are associated with contractions of the heart and suggests this difference causes the left ventricle to contract harder to create more pressure for a completed circulation of blood around the body.

The atrioventricular node position differs from other fowl. It is located in the endocardium of the atrial surface of the right atrioventricular valve. It is not covered by connective tissue, which is characteristic of vertebrate heart anatomy. It also contains fewer myofibrils than usual myocardial cells. The AV node connects the atrial and ventricular chambers. It functions to carry the electrical impulse from the atria to the ventricle. Upon view, the myocardial cells are observed to have large densely packed chromosomes within the nucleus.

The coronary arteries start in the right and left aortic sinus and provide blood to the heart muscle in a similar fashion to most other vertebrates. Other domestic birds capable of flight have three or more coronary arteries that supply blood to the heart muscle. The blood supply by the coronary arteries are fashioned starting as a large branch over the surface of the heart. It then moves along the coronary groove and continues on into the tissue as interventricular branches toward the apex of the heart. The atria, ventricles, and septum are supplied of blood by this modality. The deep branches of the coronary arteries found within the heart tissue are small and supply the interventricular and right atrioventricular valve with blood nutrients for which to carry out their processes. The interatrial artery of the ostrich is small in size and exclusively supplies blood to only part of the left auricle and interatrial septum.

These Purkinje fibres (p-fibres) found in the hearts moderator bands are a specialised cardiac muscle fibre that causes the heart to contract. The Purkinje cells are mostly found within both the endocardium and the sub-endocardium. The sinoatrial node shows a small concentration of Purkinje fibres, however, continuing through the conducting pathway of the heart the bundle of his shows the highest amount of these Purkinje fibres.

==== Blood composition ====
The red blood cell count per unit volume in the ostrich is about 40% of that of a human; however, the red blood cells of the ostrich are about three times larger than the red blood cells of a human. The blood oxygen affinity, known as P_{50}, is higher than that of both humans and similar avian species. The reason for this decreased oxygen affinity is due to the haemoglobin configuration found in common ostrich blood. The common ostrich's tetramer is composed of haemoglobin type A and D, compared to typical mammalian tetramers composed of haemoglobin type A and B; haemoglobin D configuration causes a decreased oxygen affinity at the site of the respiratory surface.

During the embryonic stage, Hemoglobin E is present. This subtype increases oxygen affinity in order to transport oxygen across the allantoic membrane of the embryo. This can be attributed to the high metabolic need of the developing embryo, thus high oxygen affinity serves to satisfy this demand. When the chick hatches haemoglobin E diminishes while haemoglobin A and D increase in concentration. This shift in haemoglobin concentration results in both decreased oxygen affinity and increased P_{50} value.

Furthermore, the P_{50} value is influenced by differing organic modulators. In the typical mammalian RBC 2,3 – DPG causes a lower affinity for oxygen. 2,3- DPG constitutes approximately 42–47%, of the cells phosphate of the embryonic ostrich. However, the adult ostrich have no traceable 2,3- DPG.In place of 2,3-DPG the ostrich uses inositol polyphosphates (IPP), which vary from 1–6 phosphates per molecule. In relation to the IPP, the ostrich also uses ATP to lower oxygen affinity. ATP has a consistent concentration of phosphate in the cell, around 31% at incubation periods and dropping to 16–20% in 36-day-old chicks. However, IPP has low concentrations, around 4%, of total phosphate concentration in embryonic stages, but the IPP concentration jumps to 60% of total phosphate of the cell. The majority of phosphate concentration switches from 2,3- DPG to IPP, suggesting the result of the overall low oxygen affinity is due to these varying polyphosphates.

Concerning immunological adaptation, it was discovered that wild common ostriches have a pronounced non-specific immunity defence, with blood content reflecting high values of lysosome and phagocyte cells in medium. This is in contrast to domesticated ostriches, who in captivity develop high concentration of immunoglobulin antibodies in their circulation, indicating an acquired immunological response. It is suggested that this immunological adaptability may allow this species to have a high success rate of survival in variable environmental settings.

=== Osmoregulation ===
==== Physiological challenges ====
The common ostrich is a xeric animal, due to the fact that it lives in habitats that are both dry and hot. Water is scarce in dry and hot environments, and this poses a challenge to the ostrich's water consumption. Also the ostrich is a ground bird and cannot fly to find water sources, which poses a further challenge. Because of their size, common ostriches cannot easily escape the heat of their environment; however, they dehydrate less than their small bird counterparts because of their small surface area to volume ratio. Hot, arid habitats pose osmotic stress, such as dehydration, which triggers the common ostrich's homeostatic response to osmoregulate.

==== System overview ====
The common ostrich is well-adapted to hot, arid environments through specialisation of excretory organs. The common ostrich has an extremely long and well-developed colon, a length of approximately 11–13 m (36–43 ft) between the coprodeum and the paired caeca, which are around 80 cm (31 in) long. A well-developed caeca is also found and, in combination with the rectum, forms the microbial fermentation chambers used for carbohydrate breakdown. The catabolism of carbohydrates produces around 0.56 g (8.6 gr) of water that can be used internally. The majority of their urine is stored in the coprodeum, and the faeces are stored separately in the terminal colon. The coprodeum is located ventral to the terminal rectum and urodeum (where the ureters open). A strong sphincter is found between the terminal rectum and the coprodeum. The coprodeum and cloaca are the main osmoregulatory mechanisms used for the regulation and reabsorption of ions and water, or net water conservation. As expected in a species inhabiting arid regions, dehydration causes a reduction in faecal water, or dry faeces. This reduction is believed to be caused by high levels of plasma aldosterone, which leads to rectal absorption of sodium and water. Also expected is the production of hyperosmotic urine; cloacal urine has been found to be 800 mOsm. The U:P (urine:plasma) ratio of the common ostrich is therefore greater than one. Diffusion of water to the coprodeum (where urine is stored) from plasma across the epithelium is voided. This void is believed to be caused by the thick mucosal layering of the coprodeum.

===== Kidney function =====
Common ostriches have two kidneys, which are chocolate brown in colour, are granular in texture, and lie in a depression in the pelvic cavity of the dorsal wall. They are covered by peritoneum and a layer of fat. Each kidney is about 300 mm (12 in) long, 70 mm (2.8 in) wide, and divided into a cranial, middle, and caudal sections by large veins. The caudal section is the largest, extending into the middle of the pelvis. The ureters leave the ventral caudomedial surface and continue caudally, near the midline into the opening of the urodeum of the cloaca. Although there is no bladder, a dilated pouch of ureter stores the urine until it is secreted continuously down from the ureters to the urodeum until discharged.

Common ostrich kidneys are fairly large and so are able to hold significant amounts of solutes. Hence, common ostriches drink relatively large volumes of water daily and excrete generous quantities of highly concentrated urine. It is when drinking water is unavailable or withdrawn that the urine becomes highly concentrated with uric acid and urates. It seems that common ostriches who normally drink relatively large amounts of water tend to rely on renal conservation of water within the kidney system when drinking water is scarce. Though there have been no official detailed renal studies conducted on the flow rate (Poiseuille's Law) and composition of the ureteral urine in the ostrich, knowledge of renal function has been based on samples of cloacal urine, and samples or quantitative collections of voided urine. Studies have shown that the amount of water intake and dehydration impacts the plasma osmolality and urine osmolality within various sized ostriches. During a normal hydration state of the kidneys, young ostriches tend to have a measured plasma osmolality of 284 mOsm and urine osmolality of 62 mOsm. Adults have higher rates with a plasma osmolality of 330 mOsm and urine osmolality of 163 mOsm. The osmolality of both plasma and urine can alter in regards to whether there is an excess or depleted amount of water present within the kidneys. An interesting fact of common ostriches is that when water is freely available, the urine osmolality can reduce to 60–70 mOsm, not losing any necessary solutes from the kidneys when excess water is excreted. Dehydrated or salt-loaded ostriches can reach a maximal urine osmolality of approximately 800 mOsm. When the plasma osmolality has been measured simultaneously with the maximal osmotic urine, it is seen that the urine:plasma ratio is 2.6:1, the highest encountered among avian species. Along with dehydration, there is also a reduction in flow rate from 20 L·d^{−1} to only 0.3–0.5 L·d^{−1}.

In mammals and common ostriches, the increase of the glomerular filtration rate (GFR) and urine flow rate (UFR) is due to a high protein diets. As seen in various studies, scientists have measured clearance of creatinine, a fairly reliable marker of glomerular filtration rate (GFR). It has been seen that during normal hydration within the kidneys, the glomerular filtration rate is approximately 92 ml/min. However, when an ostrich experiences dehydration for at least 48 hours (2 days), this value diminishes to only 25% of the hydrated GFR rate. Thus in response to the dehydration, ostrich kidneys secrete small amounts of very viscous glomerular filtrates that have not been broken down and return them to the circulatory system through blood vessels. The reduction of GFR during dehydration is extremely high and so the fractional excretion of water (urine flow rate as a percentage of GFR) drops down from 15% at normal hydration to 1% during dehydration.

===== Water intake and turnover =====
Common ostriches employ adaptive features to manage the dry heat and solar radiation in their habitat. Ostriches will drink available water; however, they are limited in accessing water by being flightless. They are also able to harvest water through dietary means, consuming plants such as the Euphorbia heterochroma that hold up to 87% water.

Water mass accounts for 68% of body mass in adult common ostriches; this is down from 84% water mass in 35-day-old chicks. The differing degrees of water retention are thought to be a result of varying body fat mass. In comparison to smaller birds ostriches have a lower evaporative water loss resulting from their small body surface area per unit weight.

When heat stress is at its maximum, common ostriches are able to recover evaporative loss by using a metabolic water mechanism to counter the loss by urine, faeces, and respiratory evaporation. An experiment to determine the primary source of water intake in the ostrich indicated that while the ostrich does employ a metabolic water production mechanism as a source of hydration, the most important source of water is food. When ostriches were restricted to the no food or water condition, the metabolic water production was only 0.5 L·d^{−1}, while total water lost to urine, faeces, and evaporation was 2.3 L·d^{−1}. When the birds were given both water and food, total water gain was 8.5 L·d^{−1}. In the food only condition total water gain was 10.1 L·d^{−1}. These results show that the metabolic water mechanism is not able to sustain water loss independently and that food intake, specifically of plants with a high water content such as Euphorbia heterochroma, is necessary to overcome water loss challenges in the common ostrich's arid habitat.

In times of water deprivation, urine electrolyte and osmotic concentration increases while urination rate decreases. Under these conditions urine solute:plasma ratio is approximately 2.5, or hyperosmotic; that is to say that the ratio of solutes to water in the plasma is shifted down whereby reducing osmotic pressure in the plasma. Water is then able to be held back from excretion, keeping the ostrich hydrated, while the passed urine contains higher concentrations of solute. This mechanism exemplifies how renal function facilitates water retention during periods of dehydration stress.

===== Nasal glands =====
A number of avian species use nasal salt glands, alongside their kidneys, to control hypertonicity in their blood plasma. However, the common ostrich shows no nasal glandular function in regard to this homeostatic process. Even in a state of dehydration, which increases the osmolality of the blood, nasal salt glands show no sizeable contribution of salt elimination. Also, the overall mass of the glands was less than that of the duck's nasal gland. The common ostrich, having a heavier body weight, should have larger, heavier nasal glands to more effectively excrete salt from a larger volume of blood, but this is not the case. These unequal proportions contribute to the assumption that the common ostrich's nasal glands do not play any role in salt excretion.

===== Biochemistry =====
The majority of the common ostrich's internal solutes are made up of sodium ions (Na^{+}), potassium ions (K^{+}), chloride ions (Cl^{−}), total short-chain fatty acids (SCFA), and acetate. The caecum contains a high water concentration with reduced levels nearing the terminal colon and exhibits a rapid fall in Na^{+} concentrations and small changes in K^{+} and Cl^{−}. The colon is divided into three sections and takes part in solute absorption. The upper colon largely absorbs Na^{+} and SCFA and partially absorbs KCl. The middle colon absorbs Na^{+} and SCFA, with little net transfer of K^{+} and Cl^{−}. The lower colon then slightly absorbs Na^{+} and water and secretes K^{+}. There is no net movements of Cl^{−} and SCFA found in the lower colon.

When the common ostrich is in a dehydrated state, plasma osmolality, Na^{+}, K^{+}, and Cl^{−} ions all increase; however, K^{+} ions return to controlled concentration. The common ostrich also experiences an increase in haematocrit, resulting in a hypovolemic state. Two antidiuretic hormones, arginine vasotocin (AVT) and angiotensin (AII), are increased in blood plasma as a response to hyperosmolality and hypovolemia. AVT triggers antidiuretic hormone (ADH) which targets the nephrons of the kidney. ADH causes a reabsorption of water from the lumen of the nephron to the extracellular fluid osmotically. These extracellular fluids then drain into blood vessels, causing a rehydrating effect. This drainage prevents loss of water by both lowering volume and increasing concentration of the urine. Angiotensin, on the other hand, causes vasoconstriction on the systemic arterioles and acts as a dipsogen for ostriches. Both of these antidiuretic hormones work together to maintain water levels in the body that would normally be lost due to the osmotic stress of the arid environment.

Ostriches are uricotelic, excreting nitrogen in the form of uric acid and related derivatives. Uric acid's low solubility in water gives a semi-solid paste consistency to the ostrich's nitrogenous waste.

=== Thermoregulation ===
Common ostriches are homeothermic endotherms; they regulate a constant body temperature via regulating their metabolic heat rate. They closely regulate their core body temperature, but their appendages may be cooler in comparison as found with regulating species. The temperature of their beak, neck surfaces, lower legs, feet, and toes are regulated through heat exchange with the environment. Up to 40% of their produced metabolic heat is dissipated across these structures, which account for about 12% of their total surface area. Total evaporative water loss (TEWL) is statistically lower in the common ostrich than in membering ratites.

As ambient temperature increases, dry heat loss decreases, but evaporative heat loss increases because of increased respiration. As ostriches experience high ambient temperatures, circa 50 °C (122 °F), they become slightly hyperthermic; however, they can maintain a stable body temperature, around 40 °C (104 °F), for up to 8 hours in these conditions. When dehydrated, the common ostrich minimises water loss, causing the body temperature to increase further. When the body heat is allowed to increase the temperature gradient between the common ostrich and ambient heat is equilibrated.

==== Physical adaptations ====
Common ostriches have developed a comprehensive set of behavioural adaptations for thermoregulation, such as altering their feathers. Common ostriches display a feather fluffing behaviour that aids them in thermoregulation by regulating convective heat loss at high ambient temperatures. They may also physically seek out shade in times of high ambient temperatures. When feather fluffing, they contract their muscles to raise their feathers to increase the air space next to their skin. This air space provides an insulating thickness of 7 cm (2.8 in). The ostrich will also expose the thermal windows of their unfeathered skin to enhance convective and radiative loss in times of heat stress. At higher ambient temperatures lower appendage temperature increases to 5 °C (9.0 °F) difference from ambient temperature. Neck surfaces are around 6–7 °C (11–13 °F) difference at most ambient temperatures, except when temperatures are around 25 °C (77 °F) it was only 4 °C (7.2 °F) above ambient.

At low ambient temperatures the common ostrich uses feather flattening, which conserves body heat through insulation. The low conductance coefficient of air allows less heat to be lost to the environment. This flattening behaviour compensate for common ostrich's rather poor cutaneous evaporative water loss (CEWL). These feather-heavy areas such as the body, thighs, and wings do not usually vary much from ambient temperatures due to this behavioural controls. This ostrich will also cover its legs to reduce heat loss to the environment, along with undergoing piloerection and shivering when faced with low ambient temperatures.

==== Internal adaptations ====
The use of countercurrent heat exchange with blood flow allows for regulated conservation/ elimination of heat of appendages. When ambient temperatures are low, heterotherms will constrict their arterioles to reduce heat loss along skin surfaces. The reverse occurs at high ambient temperatures, arterioles dilate to increase heat loss.

At ambient temperatures below their body temperatures (thermal neutral zone (TNZ)), common ostriches decrease body surface temperatures so that heat loss occurs only across about 10% of total surface area. This 10% include critical areas that require blood flow to remain high to prevent freezing, such as their eyes. Their eyes and ears tend to be the warmest regions. It has been found that temperatures of lower appendages were no more than 2.5 °C (4.5 °F) above ambient temperature, which minimises heat exchange between feet, toes, wings, and legs.

Both the Gular and air sacs, being close to body temperature, are the main contributors to heat and water loss. Surface temperature can be affected by the rate of blood flow to a certain area and also by the surface area of the surrounding tissue. The ostrich reduces blood flow to the trachea to cool itself and vasodilates to its blood vessels around the gular region to raise the temperature of the tissue. The air sacs are poorly vascularised but show an increased temperature, which aids in heat loss.

Common ostriches have evolved a 'selective brain cooling' mechanism as a means of thermoregulation. This modality allows the common ostrich to manage the temperature of the blood going to the brain in response to the extreme ambient temperature of the surroundings. The morphology for heat exchange occurs via cerebral arteries and the ophthalmic rete, a network of arteries originating from the ophthalmic artery. The ophthalmic rete is analogous to the carotid rete found in mammals, as it also facilitates transfer of heat from arterial blood coming from the core to venous blood returning from the evaporative surfaces at the head.

Researchers suggest that common ostriches also employ a 'selective brain warming' mechanism in response to cooler surrounding temperatures in the evenings. The brain was found to maintain a warmer temperature when compared to carotid arterial blood supply. Researchers suggest three mechanisms that could explain this finding:

1. They first suggest a possible increase in metabolic heat production within the brain tissue itself to compensate for the colder arterial blood arriving from the core.
2. They also speculate that there is an overall decrease in cerebral blood flow to the brain.
3. Finally, they suggest that warm venous blood perfusion at the ophthalmic rete helps to warm the cerebral blood that supplies the hypothalamus.

Further research will need to be done to find how this occurs.

==== Breathing adaptations ====
The common ostrich has no sweat glands, and under heat stress they rely on panting to reduce their body temperature. Panting increases evaporative heat (and water) loss from its respiratory surfaces, therefore forcing air and heat removal without the loss of metabolic salts. Panting allows the common ostrich to have a very effective respiratory evaporative water loss (REWL). Heat dissipated by respiratory evaporation increases linearly with ambient temperature, matching the rate of heat production. As a result of panting the common ostrich should eventually experience alkalosis. However, The CO_{2} concentration in the blood does not change when hot ambient temperatures are experienced. This effect is caused by a lung surface shunt. The lung is not completely shunted, allowing enough oxygen to fulfill the bird's metabolic needs. The common ostrich uses gular fluttering, rapid rhythmic contraction and relaxation of throat muscles, in a similar way to panting. Both these actions allow the ostrich to actively increase the rate of evaporative cooling.

In hot temperatures water is lost via respiration. Moreover, varying surface temperatures within the respiratory tract contribute differently to overall heat and water loss through panting. The surface temperature of the gular area is 38 °C (100 °F), that of the tracheal area is between 34 and 36 °C (93 and 97 °F), and that of both anterior and posterior air sacs is 38 °C (100 °F). The long trachea, being cooler than body temperature, is a site of water evaporation.

As ambient air becomes hotter, additional evaporation can take place lower in the trachea making its way to the posterior sacs, shunting the lung surface. The trachea acts as a buffer for evaporation because of the length and the controlled vascularisation. The Gular is also heavily vascularised; its purpose is for cooling blood, but also evaporation, as previously stated. Air flowing through the trachea can be either laminar or turbulent depending on the state of the bird. When the common ostrich is breathing normally, under no heat stress, air flow is laminar. When the common ostrich is experiencing heat stress from the environment the air flow is considered turbulent. This suggests that laminar air flow causes little to no heat transfer, while under heat stress turbulent airflow can cause maximum heat transfer within the trachea.

==== Metabolism ====
Common ostriches are able to attain their necessary energetic requirements via the oxidation of absorbed nutrients. Much of the metabolic rate in animals is dependent upon their allometry, the relationship between body size to shape, anatomy, physiology, and behaviour of an animal. Hence, it is plausible to state that metabolic rate in animals with larger masses is greater than animals with a smaller mass.

When a bird is inactive and unfed, and the ambient temperature (i.e. in the thermo-neutral zone) is high, the energy expended is at its minimum. This level of expenditure is better known as the basal metabolic rate (BMR), and can be calculated by measuring the amount of oxygen consumed during various activities. Therefore, in common ostriches we see use of more energy when compared to smaller birds in absolute terms, but less per unit mass.

A key point when looking at the common ostrich metabolism is to note that it is a non-passerine bird. Thus, BMR in ostriches is particularly low with a value of only 0.113 mL O_{2} g^{−1} h^{−1}. This value can further be described using Kleiber's law, which relates the BMR to the body mass of an animal.

Metabolic rate = 70M^{0.75}

where M is body mass, and metabolic rate is measured in kcal per day.

In common ostriches, a BMR (mL O_{2} g^{−1} h^{−1}) = 389 kg^{0.73}, describing a line parallel to the intercept with only about 60% in relation to other non-passerine birds.

Along with BMR, energy is also needed for a range of other activities. If the ambient temperature is lower than the thermo-neutral zone, heat is produced to maintain body temperature. So, the metabolic rate in a resting, unfed bird, that is producing heat is known as the standard metabolic rate (SMR) or resting metabolic rate (RMR). The common ostrich SMR has been seen to be approximately 0.26 mL O_{2} g^{−1} h^{−1}, almost 2.3 times the BMR. On another note, animals that engage in extensive physical activity employ substantial amounts of energy for power. This is known as the maximum metabolic scope. In an ostrich, it is seen to be at least 28 times greater than the BMR. Likewise, the daily energy turnover rate for an ostrich with access to free water is 12,700 kJ d^{−1}, equivalent to 0.26 mL O_{2} g^{−1} h^{−1}.

== Status and conservation ==
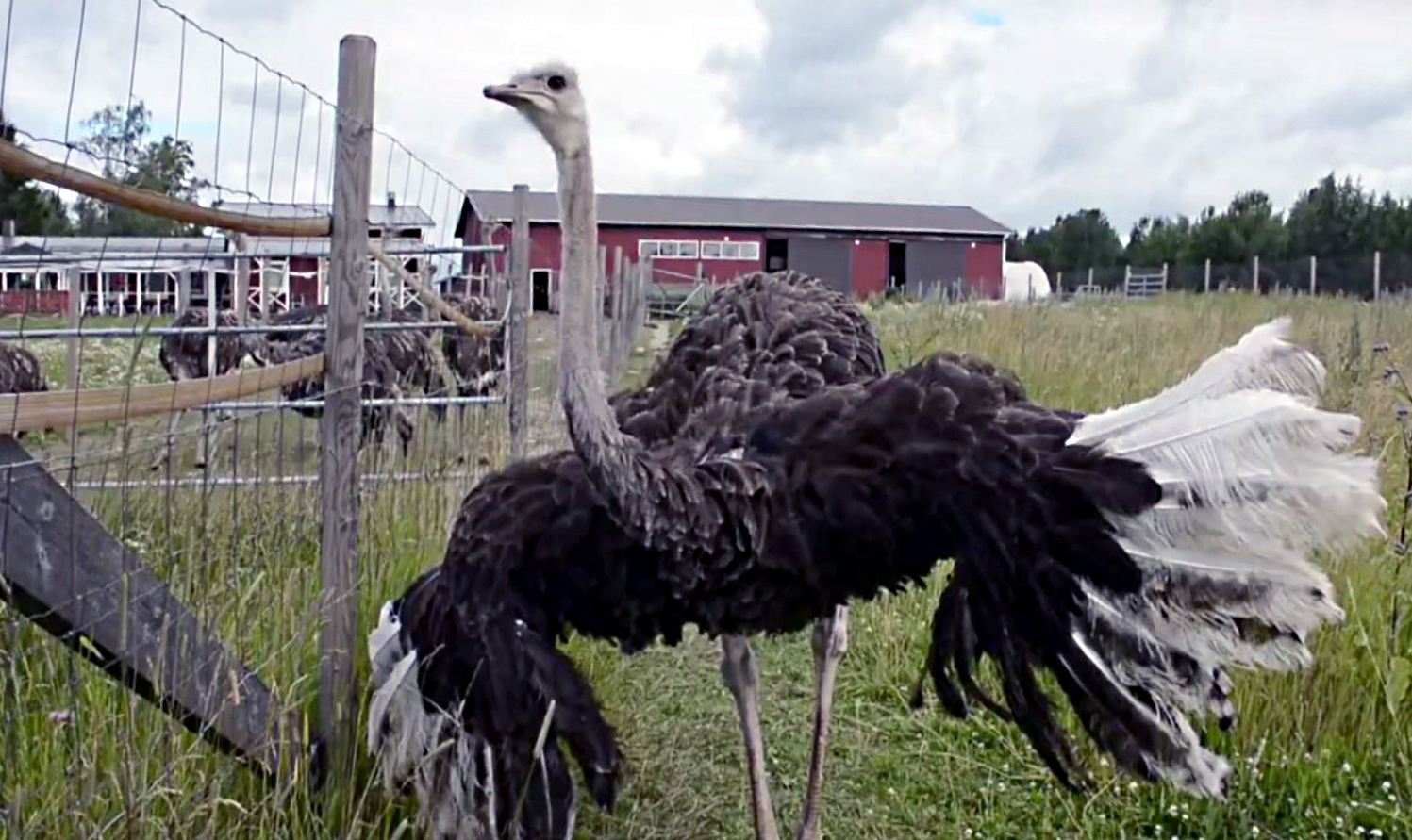
The Ketola Ostrich Farm in Nurmijärvi, Finland

The wild common ostrich population has declined drastically in the last 200 years, with most surviving birds in reserves or on farms. However, its range remains very large (9,800,000 km^{2} or 3,800,000 sq mi), leading the IUCN and BirdLife International to treat it as a species of least concern. Of its five subspecies, the Arabian ostrich (S. c. syriacus) became extinct around 1966. North African ostrich populations are protected under Appendix I of the CITES (Convention on International Trade in Endangered Species of Wild Fauna and Flora) meaning commercial international trade is prohibited and non-commercial trade is strictly regulated.

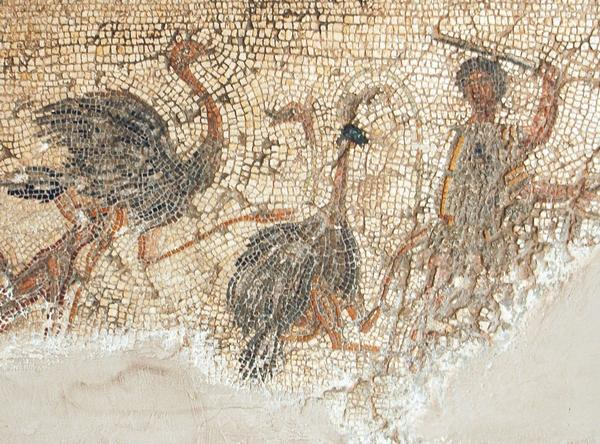
Roman mosaic, 2nd century AD

== Humans ==
Common ostriches have inspired cultures and civilisations for 5,000 years in Mesopotamia and African centres like Egypt and the Kingdom of Kush. A statue of Arsinoe II of Egypt riding a common ostrich was found in a tomb in Egypt. Hunter-gatherers in the Kalahari use ostrich eggshells as water containers, punching a hole in them. They also produce jewelry from it. The presence of such eggshells with engraved hatched symbols dating from the Howiesons Poort period of the Middle Stone Age at Diepkloof Rock Shelter in South Africa suggests common ostriches were an important part of human life as early as 60,000 BP.

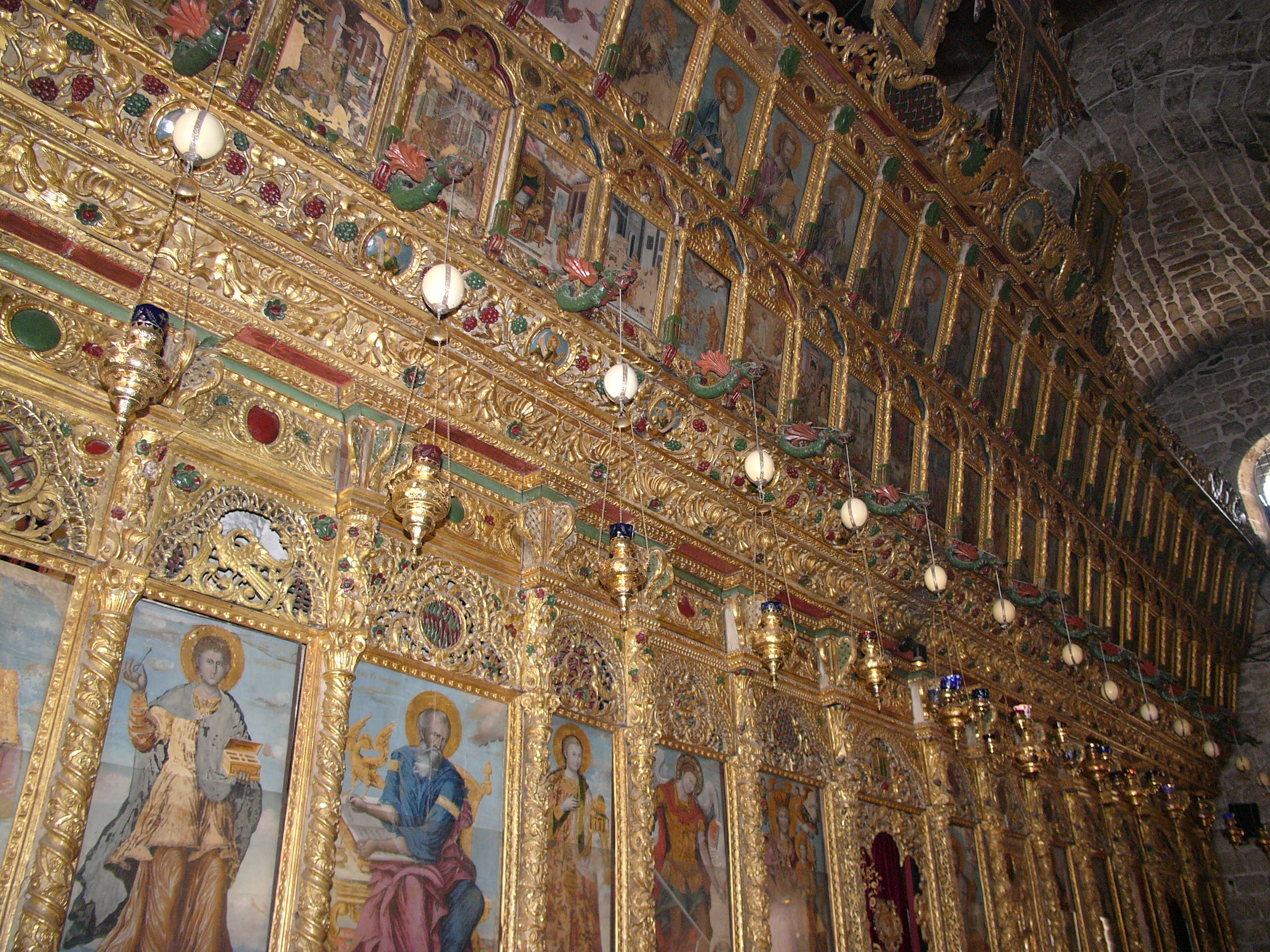
Eggs on the oil lamps of the Church of Saint Lazarus, Larnaca, Cyprus

In Eastern Christianity it is common to hang decorated common ostrich eggs on the chains holding the oil lamps. The initial reason was probably to prevent mice and rats from climbing down the chain to eat the oil. Another, symbolical explanation is based in the fictitious tradition that female common ostriches do not sit on their eggs, but stare at them incessantly until they hatch out, because if they stop staring even for a second the egg will addle. This is equated to the obligation of the Christian to direct his entire attention toward God during prayer, lest the prayer be fruitless.

=== "Head in the sand" misconception ===
Contrary to a popular assumption, ostriches do not bury their heads in sand to avoid danger. This misconception likely began with Pliny the Elder (23–79 CE), who wrote that ostriches "imagine, when they have thrust their head and neck into a bush, that the whole of their body is concealed". This may have been a misunderstanding of their sticking their heads in the sand to swallow sand and pebbles to help digest their fibrous food, or, as National Geographic suggests, of the defensive behaviour of lying low, so that they may appear from a distance to have their head buried. Another possible origin for the assumption lies with the fact that ostriches keep their eggs in holes in the sand instead of nests and must rotate them using their beaks during incubation; digging the hole, placing the eggs, and rotating them might each be mistaken for an attempt to bury their heads in the sand. This misconception gave rise to the term "ostrich effect" for avoiding negative information.

=== Economic use ===
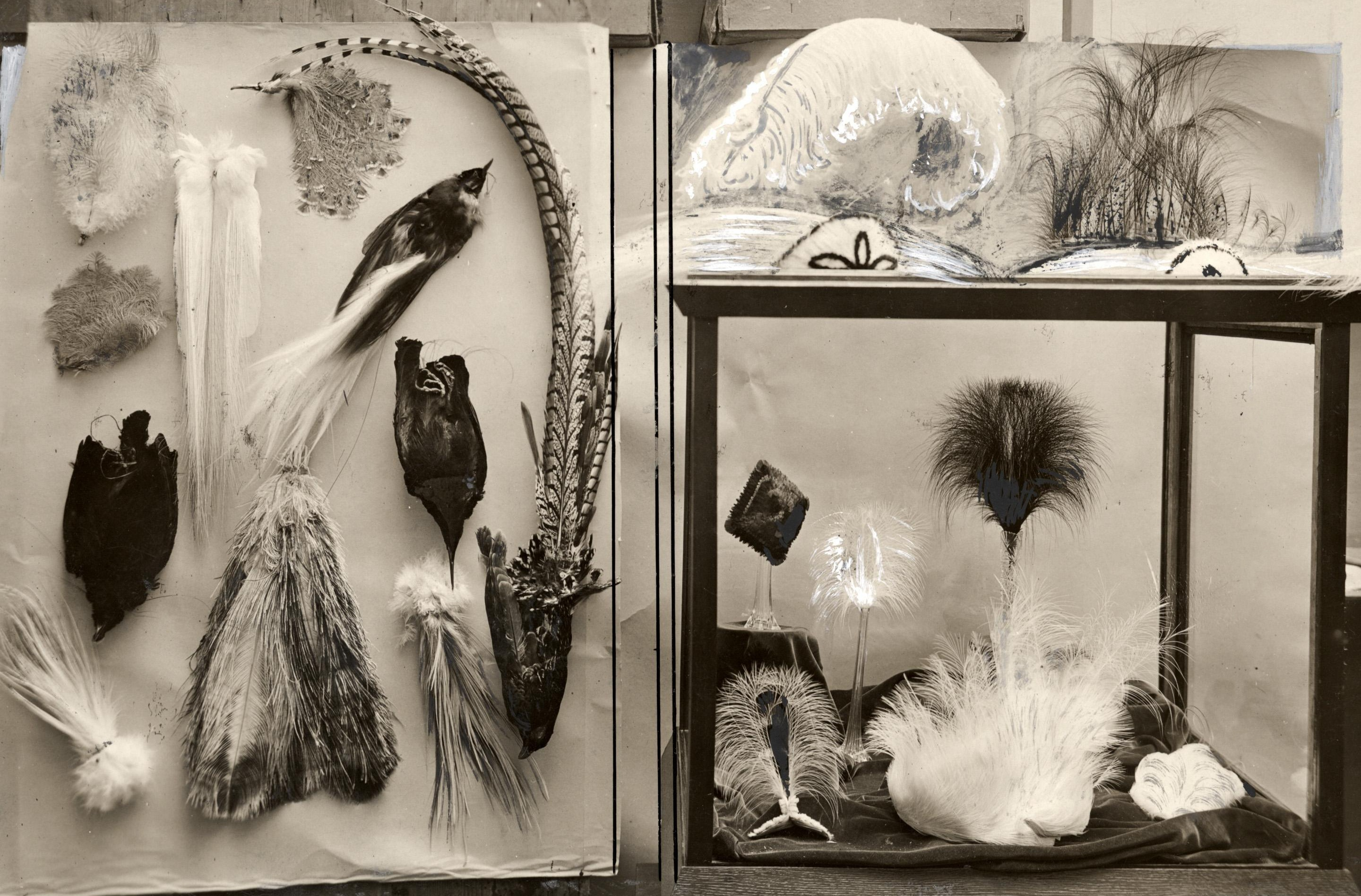
Fashion accessories, Amsterdam, 1919

Being moved between camps in preparation for filming a movie in South Africa

In Roman times, there was a demand for common ostriches to use in venatio games, cooking, or medicine. They have been hunted and farmed for their feathers, which at various times have been popular for ornamentation in fashionable clothing (such as hats during the 19th century). Their skins are valued for their leather. In the 18th century they were almost hunted to extinction; farming for feathers began in the 19th century. At the start of the 20th century there were over 700,000 birds in captivity. The market for feathers collapsed after World War I, but commercial farming for feathers and later for skins and meat became widespread during the 1970s.

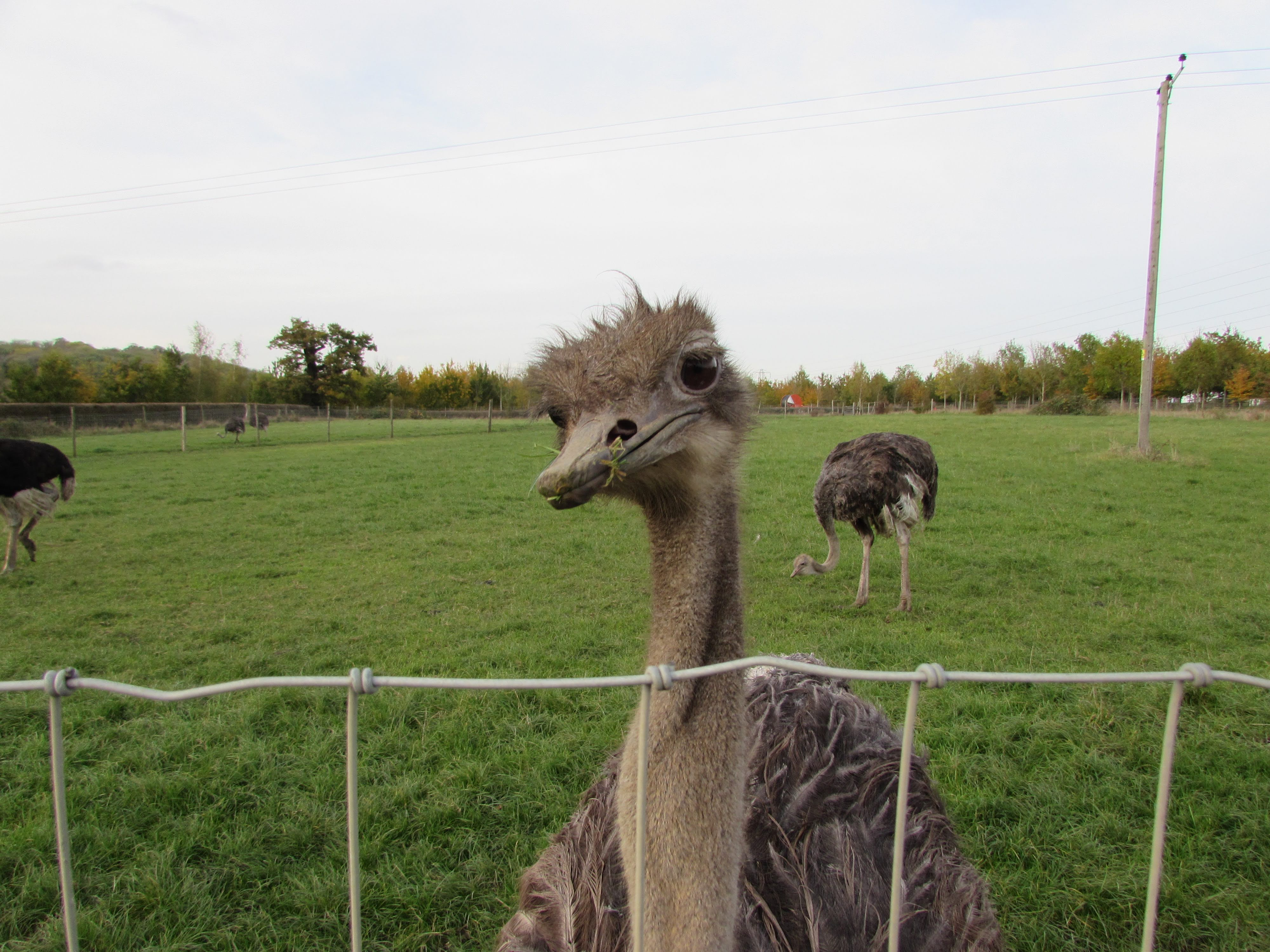
An ostrich in captivity in a farm park in Gloucestershire, England.

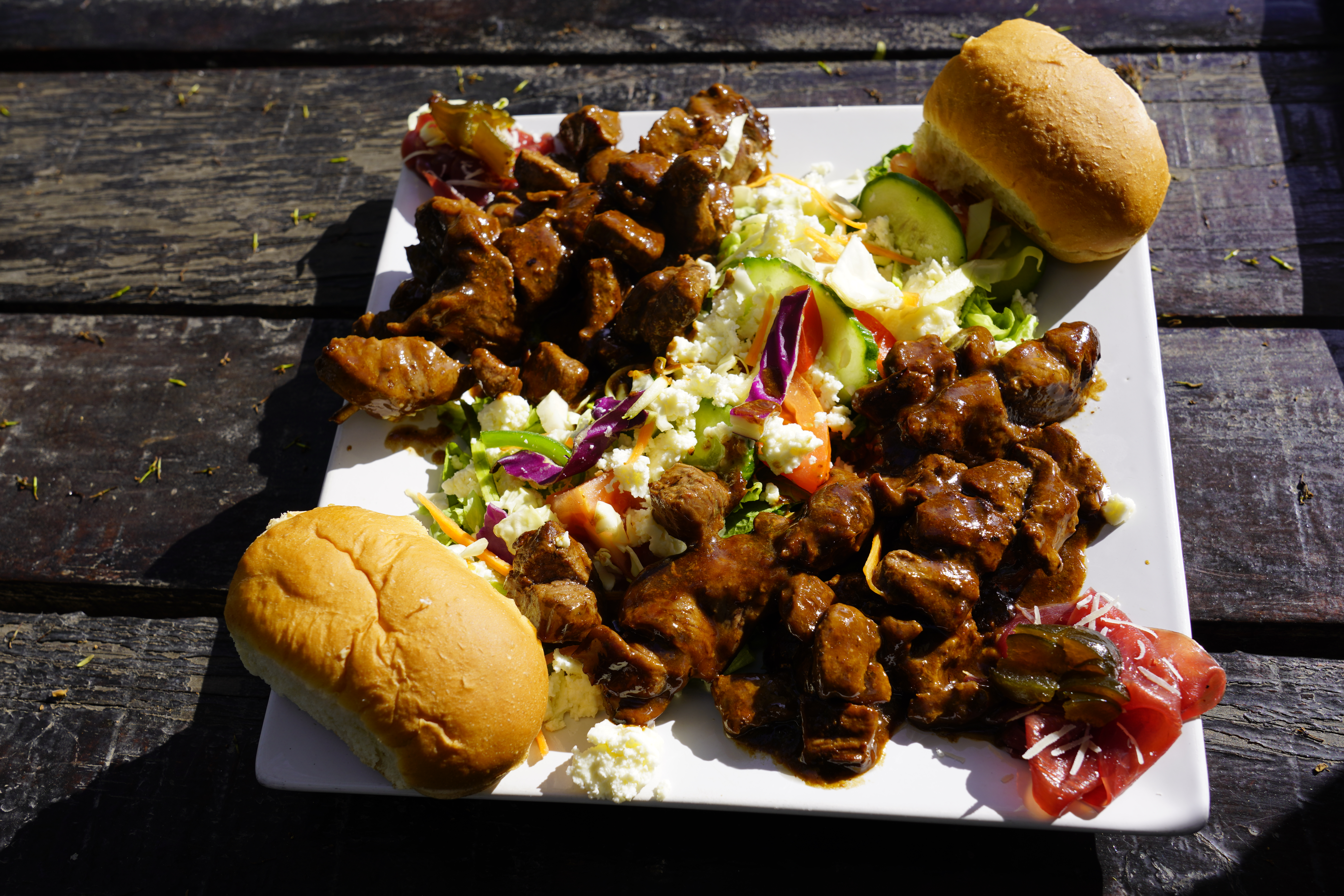
A platter of ostrich meat in Oudtshoorn, South Africa

Common ostriches have been farmed in South Africa since the beginning of the 19th century. According to Frank G. Carpenter, the English are credited with first taming common ostriches outside Cape Town. Farmers captured baby common ostriches and raised them successfully on their property, and they were able to obtain a crop of feathers every seven to eight months instead of killing wild common ostriches for their feathers. Feathers are still commercially harvested. It is claimed that common ostriches produce the strongest commercial leather. Common ostrich meat tastes similar to lean beef and is low in fat and cholesterol, as well as high in calcium, protein, and iron. It is considered to be both poultry and red meat. Uncooked, it is dark red or cherry red, a little darker than beef. Ostrich stew is a dish prepared using common ostrich meat.

Some common ostrich farms also cater to agritourism, which may produce a substantial portion of the farm's income. This may include tours of the farmlands, souvenirs, or even ostrich rides.

=== Attacks ===
Common ostriches typically avoid humans in the wild, since they correctly assess humans as potential predators. If approached, they often run away, but sometimes ostriches can be very aggressive when threatened, especially if cornered, and may also attack if they feel the need to defend their territories or offspring. Similar behaviour is noted in captive or domesticated common ostriches, which retain the same natural instincts and can occasionally respond aggressively to stress. When attacking a person, common ostriches deliver slashing kicks with their powerful feet, armed with long claws, with which they can disembowel or kill a person with a single blow. In one study of common ostrich attacks, it was estimated that two to three attacks that result in serious injury or death occur each year in the area of Oudtshoorn, South Africa, where a large number of common ostrich farms are set next to both feral and wild common ostrich populations, making them statistically, the world's most dangerous bird.

=== Racing ===
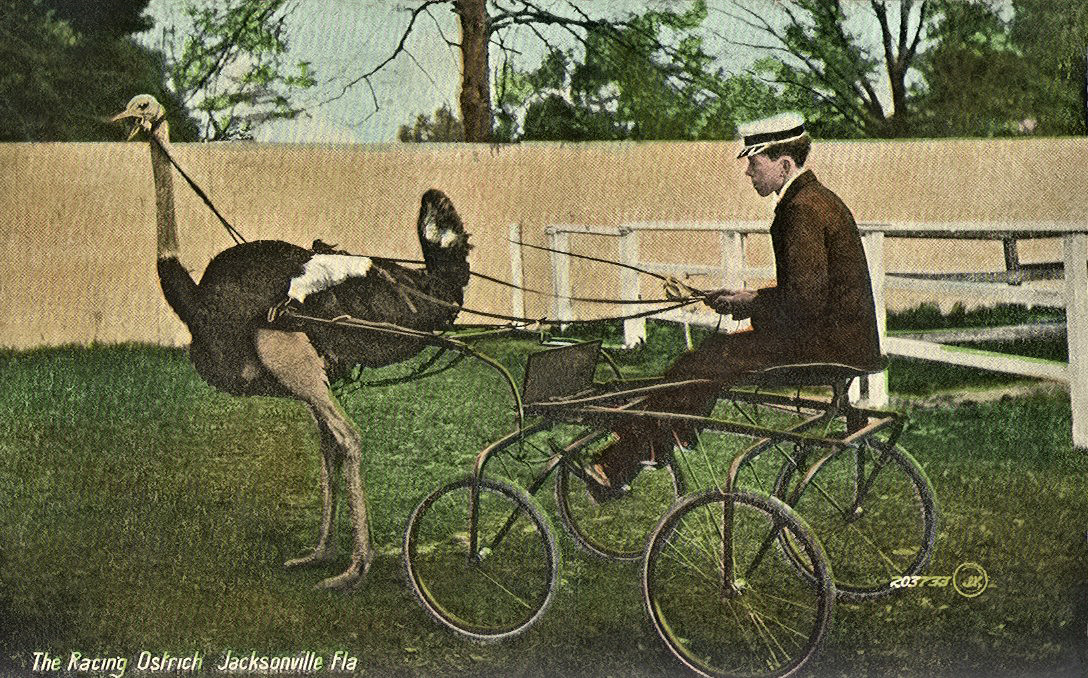
Jacksonville, Florida, c. 1911

In some countries, people race each other on the backs of common ostriches. The practice is common in South Africa and is relatively unusual elsewhere. The common ostriches are ridden in the same way as horses with special saddles, reins, and bits. However, they are harder to manage than horses. The practice is becoming less common due to ethical concerns, and nowadays ostrich farms set a limit weight for people to ride ostriches, making the activity mostly suited for children and smaller adults.

1933, The Netherlands

The racing is also a part of modern South African culture. Within the United States, a tourist attraction in Jacksonville, Florida, called 'The Ostrich Farm' opened up in 1892; it and its races became one of the most famous early attractions in the history of Florida. Likewise, the arts scene in Indio, California, consists of both ostrich and camel racing. Chandler, Arizona, hosts the annual "Ostrich Festival", which features common ostrich races. Racing has also occurred at many other locations such as Virginia City in Nevada, Canterbury Park in Minnesota, Prairie Meadows in Iowa, Ellis Park in Kentucky, and the Fairgrounds in New Orleans, Louisiana.

== See also ==
- Tallest extant birds
