= Metabolic water =

Water created by metabolism in living creatures

Metabolic water refers to water created inside a living organism through metabolism, by oxidizing energy-containing substances in food and adipose tissue. Animal metabolism produces about 107–110 grams of water per 100 grams of fat, 41–42 grams of water per 100 g of protein, and 60 grams of water per 100 g of carbohydrate.

Some organisms, especially xerocoles — animals living in the desert — rely exclusively on metabolic water. Migratory birds must rely exclusively on metabolic water production while making non-stop flights, facilitated by the high metabolic rate during such flights. Humans, by contrast, obtain only about 8–10% of their water needs through metabolic water production.

In mammals, the water produced from metabolism of protein roughly equals the amount needed to excrete the urea which is a byproduct of the metabolism of protein. Birds, however, excrete uric acid and can have a net gain of water from the metabolism of protein.
