= List of largest birds =

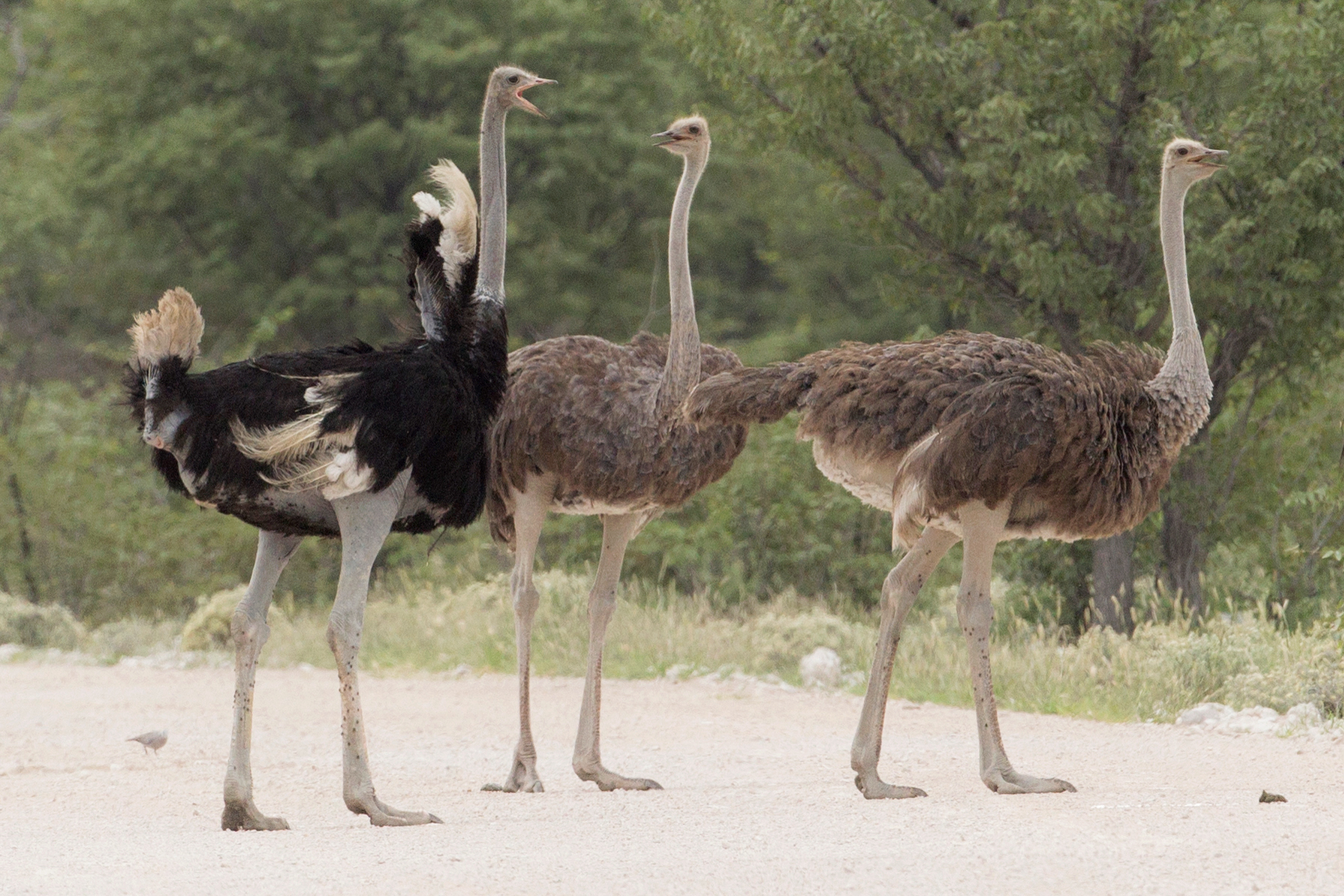
The common ostrich is the largest living bird

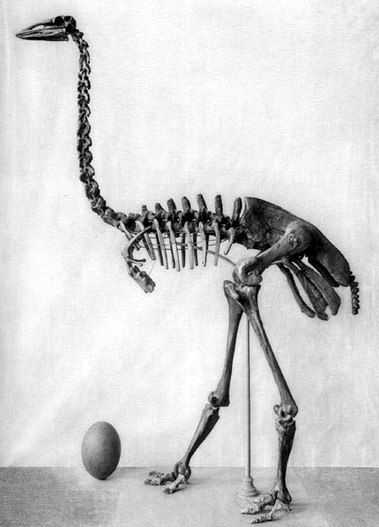
Aepyornis maximus, one of the largest birds ever

The largest extant species of bird measured by mass is the common ostrich (Struthio camelus), closely followed by the Somali ostrich (Struthio molybdophanes). A male ostrich can reach a height of 2.8 metres (9.2 feet) and weigh up to 156.8 kg (346 lb), A mass of 200 kg (440 lb) has been cited for the ostrich but no wild ostriches of this weight have been verified. Ostrich eggs are the largest of any living bird, averaging 1.4 kg (3.1 lb).

The largest wingspan of any extant bird is that of the wandering albatross (Diomedea exulans) of the Sub-Antarctic oceans. The largest dimensions found in this species are an approximate head-to-tail length of 1.44 m (4.7 ft) and a wingspan of 3.65 m (12.0 ft).

The largest bird of all time was likely the elephant bird Aepyornis maximus, which was estimated to have weighed 275–1,000 kilograms (610–2,200 lb) and stood at 3 metres (9.8 ft) tall.

The largest wingspan of any bird likely belonged to Pelagornis sandersi at roughly 6.1-7.4m (20-24 ft).

== Largest extinct birds ==
=== Table of heaviest extinct bird species ===
Rank	Binomial name	Mass estimate [kg (lb)]	Family	Order	Geological age
1	Aepyornis maximus	812 kg (1,790 lb)	Aepyornithidae (greater elephant birds)	Aepyornithiformes (elephant birds)	Late Pleistocene-Holocene
2	Dromornis stirtoni	491 kg (1,082 lb) (Note: Sexually dimorphic with larger males.)	Dromornithidae (mihirungs)	Anseriformes (waterfowl)	Late Miocene
3	Pachystruthio dmanisensis	450 kg (990 lb)	Struthionidae	Struthioniformes (ostriches)	Pliocene- Early Pleistocene
4	Brontornis burmeisteri	350 kg (770 lb)	Brontornithidae (thunderbirds)	Anseriformes (Note: Disputed, was probably an Anseriformes but could still be an Cariamiformes)(waterfowl)	Early Miocene
5	Pachystruthio indet	300 kg (660 lb)	Struthionidae	Struthioniformes (ostriches)	Early Pleistocene
6	Dromornis planei	300 kg (660 lb)	Dromornithidae (mihirungs)	Anseriformes (waterfowl)	Middle Miocene
7	Genyornis newtoni	275 kg (606 lb)	Dromornithidae (mihirungs)	Anseriformes (waterfowl)	Late Pleistocene
8	Struthio oldawayi	275 kg (606 lb)	Struthionidae	Struthioniformes (ostriches)	Pleistocene
9	Struthio anderssoni	270 kg (600 lb)	Struthionidae	Struthioniformes (ostriches)	Late Pleistocene- Holocene
10	Dromornis murrayi	250 kg (550 lb)	Dromornithidae (mihirungs)	Anseriformes (waterfowl)	Late Oligocene-Early Miocene
11	Aepyornis hildebrandti	235 kg (518 lb) (Note: This may be a vast overestimation based on robustness of the femur, A. hildebrandti was more likely to have weighted around 65 kg (143 lb).)	Aepyornithidae (greater elephant birds)	Aepyornithiformes (elephant birds)	Late Pleistocene-Holocene
12	Dromornis australis	220 kg (490 lb)	Dromornithidae (mihirungs)	Anseriformes (waterfowl)	Pliocene
13	Gastornis giganteus	200 kg (440 lb)	Gastornithidae	Anseriformes (waterfowl)	Eocene
14	Dinornis sp.	192 kg (423 lb) (Note: Sexually dimorphic with larger females. D. novozealandae noted to be somewhat smaller than D. robustus.)	Dinornithidae (giant moa)	Dinornithiformes (moa)	Late Pleistocene-Holocene
15	Paraphysornis brasilienis	180 kg (400 lb)	Phorusrhacidae (terror birds)	Cariamiformes	Early Miocene
16	Ilbandornis woodburnei	175 kg (386 lb)	Dromornithidae (mihirungs)	Anseriformes (waterfowl)	Late Miocene
17	Devincenzia pozzi	161 kg (355 lb)	Phorusrhacidae (terror birds)	Cariamiformes	Neogene
18	Ilbandornis lawsoni	150 kg (330 lb)	Dromornithidae (mihirungs)	Anseriformes (waterfowl)	Late Miocene
19	Titanis	150 kg (330 lb)	Phorusrhacidae (terror birds)	Cariamiformes	Pliocene-Early Pleistocene
20	Gastornis parisiensis	135 kg (298 lb)	Gastornithidae	Anseriformes (waterfowl)	Eocene
21	Gargantuavis philoinos	120 kg (260 lb)	Gargantuaviidae	Avialae	Late Cretaceous
22	Palaeeudyptes klekowskii	116 kg (256 lb)	Spheniscidae	Sphenisciformes (penguin)	Eocene
23	Kelenken guillermoi	100 kg (220 lb)	Phorusrhacidae (terror birds)	Cariamiformes	Middle Miocene
24	Phorusrhacos longissmus	94 kg (207 lb)	Phorusrhacidae (terror birds)	Cariamiformes	Miocene
25	Mullerornis modestus	80 kg (180 lb)	Mullerornithidae (lesser elephant birds)	Aepyornithiformes (elephant birds)	Late Pleistocene-Holocene
26	Pachyornis elephantopus	80 kg (180 lb)	Emeidae (lesser moa)	Dinornithiformes (moa)	Late Pleistocene-Holocene
27	Argentavis magnificens	71 kg (157 lb) (Note: Heaviest known flying bird)	Teratornithidae (teratorn)	Cathartiformes (New World vultures)	Miocene
28	Barawertornis tedfordi	70 kg (150 lb)	Dromornithidae (mihirungs)	Anseriformes (waterfowl)	Late Oligocene-Early Miocene
29	Mesembriornis milneedwardsi	70 kg (150 lb)	Phorusrhacidae (terror birds)	Cariamiformes	Pliocene
30	Pachyornis australis	67 kg (148 lb)	Emeidae (lesser moa)	Dinornithiformes (moa)	Late Pleistocene-Holocene
31	Emeus crassus	58 kg (128 lb)	Emeidae (lesser moa)	Dinornithiformes (moa)	Late Pleistocene-Holocene
32	Euryapteryx curtus	47.5 kg (105 lb)	Emeidae (lesser moa)	Dinornithiformes (moa)	Late Pleistocene-Holocene
33	Megalapteryx didinus	40 kg (88 lb)	Megalapterygidae (upland moa)	Dinornithiformes (moa)	Late Pleistocene-Holocene
34	Anomalopteryx didiformis	40 kg (88 lb)	Emeidae (lesser moa)	Dinornithiformes (moa)	Late Pleistocene-Holocene
35	Sylviornis neocaledoniae	30.5 kg (67 lb)	Sylviornithidae (giant megapodes)	Galliformes (landfowl)	Late Pleistocene-Holocene
36	Eremopezus eocaenus	30 kg (66 lb)	Eremopezidae		Eocene
37	Pezophaps solitaria	28 kg (62 lb) (Note: Sexually dimorphic with larger males.)	Columbidae	Columbiformes (doves and pigeons)	Holocene
38	Pachyornis geranoides	27 kg (60 lb)	Emeidae (lesser moa)	Dinornithiformes (moa)	Late Pleistocene-Holocene
39	Patagornis marshi	23 kg (51 lb)	Phorusrhacidae (terror birds)	Cariamiformes	Miocene
40	Pelagornis sandersi	21.7 kg (48 lb) (Note: Largest wingspan of any bird)	Pelagornithidae	Odontopterygiformes (pseudotooth birds)	Oligocene

== Largest extant birds ==
=== Table of heaviest extant bird species ===
The following table is a list of the heaviest extant bird species sorted by average weight, with maximum reported or reliable mass also given for comparison. The highest ranks are almost all flightless birds, having denser bones and heavier bodies. Flightless birds comprise less than 1% of all extant bird species.

Rank	Common name	Binomial name	Average mass [kg (lb)]	Maximum mass [kg (lb)]	Average total length [cm (ft)]	Flighted
1	North African ostrich	Struthio camelus camelus	104 kg (229 lb)	156.8 kg (346 lb)	210 cm (6.9 ft)	No
2	Somali ostrich	Struthio molybdophanes	90 kg (200 lb)	130 kg (290 lb)	200 cm (6.6 ft)	No
3	Southern cassowary	Casuarius casuarius	45 kg (99 lb)	119.3 kg (263 lb)	155 cm (5.09 ft)	No
4	Northern cassowary	Casuarius unappendiculatus	44 kg (97 lb)	75 kg (165 lb)	149 cm (4.89 ft)	No
5	Emu	Dromaius novaehollandiae	33 kg (73 lb)	70 kg (150 lb)	153 cm (5.02 ft)	No
6	Emperor penguin	Aptenodytes forsteri	31.5 kg (69 lb)	46 kg (101 lb)	114 cm (3.74 ft)	No
7	Greater rhea	Rhea americana	23 kg (51 lb)	40 kg (88 lb)	134 cm (4.40 ft)	No
8	Dwarf cassowary	Casuarius bennetti	19.7 kg (43 lb)	35 kg (77 lb)	100–110 cm (3.3–3.6 ft)	No
9	Lesser rhea	Rhea pennata	19.6 kg (43 lb)	28.6 kg (63 lb)	96 cm (3.15 ft)	No
10	King penguin	Aptenodytes patagonicus	13.6 kg (30 lb)	20 kg (44 lb) (wild) (Note: Captive king penguin "Pesto" weighed over 23 kg (50.7 lb).)	94–95 cm (3.08–3.12 ft)	No
11	Kori bustard	Ardeotis kori	11.4 kg (25 lb)	20 kg (44 lb)	150 cm (4.9 ft)	Yes
12	Andean condor	Vultur gryphus	11.3 kg (25 lb)	15 kg (33 lb)	100–130 cm (3.3–4.3 ft)	Yes
13	Trumpeter swan	Cygnus buccinator	11.1 kg (24 lb) (Note: Mean of provided male and female figures.)	17.2 kg (38 lb)	146 cm (57 in)	Yes
14	Mute swan	Cygnus olor	10.63 kg (23.4 lb)	22.5 kg (50 lb)	127–152 cm (4.17–4.99 ft)	Yes
15	Eurasian black vulture	Aegypius monachus	9.6 kg (21 lb)	12.5 kg (28 lb)	100–120 cm (3.3–3.9 ft)	Yes
16	Dalmatian pelican	Pelecanus crispus	9.5 kg (21 lb) (Note: Mean of provided male and female figures.)	13 kg (29 lb)	160–180 cm (5.2–5.9 ft)	Yes
17	Whooper swan	Cygnus cygnus	9.3 kg (21 lb) (Note: Mean of provided male and female figures.)	15.5 kg (34 lb)	140–165 cm (4.59–5.41 ft)	Yes
18	Wandering albatross	Diomedea exulans	9.05 kg (20.0 lb) (Note: Mean of provided male and female figures.)	16.1 kg (35 lb)	107–135 cm (3.51–4.43 ft)	Yes
19	Southern royal albatross	Diomedea epomophora	9 kg (20 lb)	10.3 kg (23 lb)	107–122 cm (3.51–4.00 ft)	Yes
20	Red-crowned crane	Grus japonensis	8.7 kg (19 lb)	12 kg (26 lb) (Note: Weights of up to 15 kg (33 lb) have been reported, but deemed questionable.)	138–152 cm (4.53–4.99 ft)	Yes
21	Wild turkey	Meleagris gallopavo	6.05 kg (13.3 lb) (wild), 13.5 kg (30 lb) (domestic)	17.06 kg (37.6 lb) (wild), 39 kg (86 lb) (domestic)	76–124 cm (2.49–4.07 ft) (wild)	Yes (Wild); No (Domestic)

=== By order ===
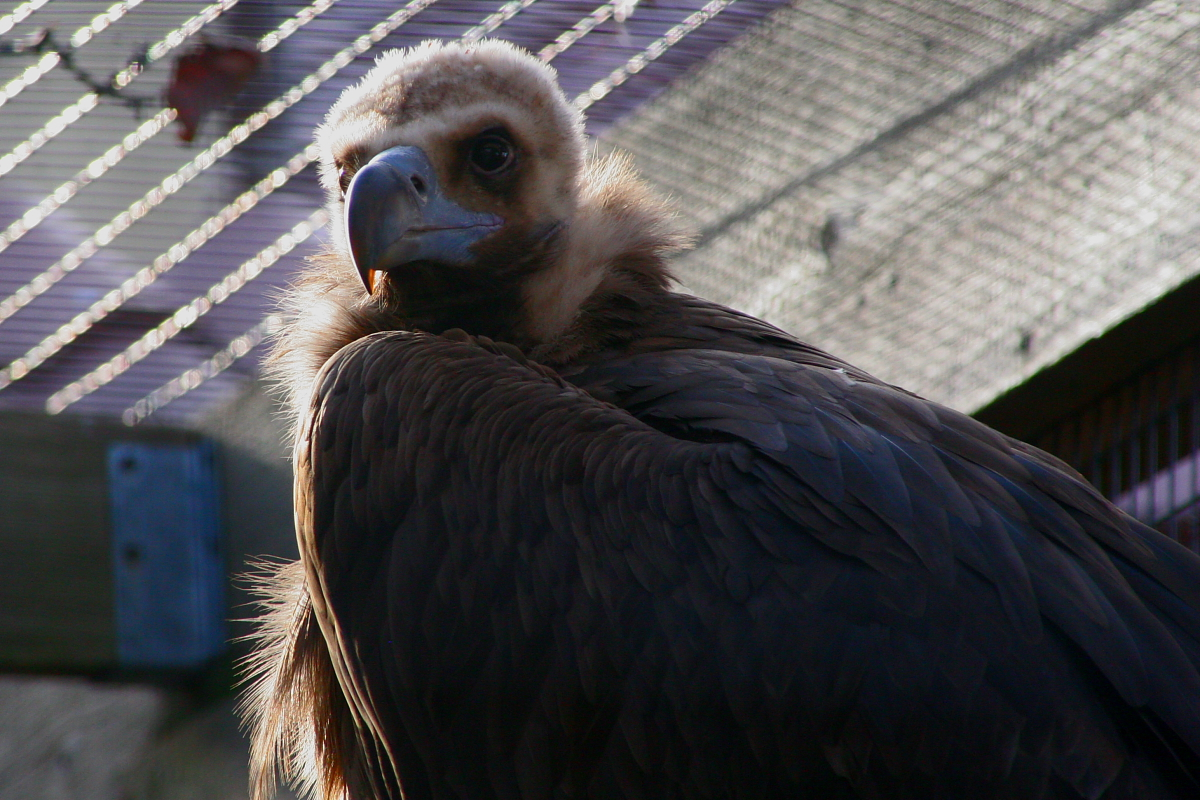
The Eurasian black vulture is the largest member of Accipitridae.

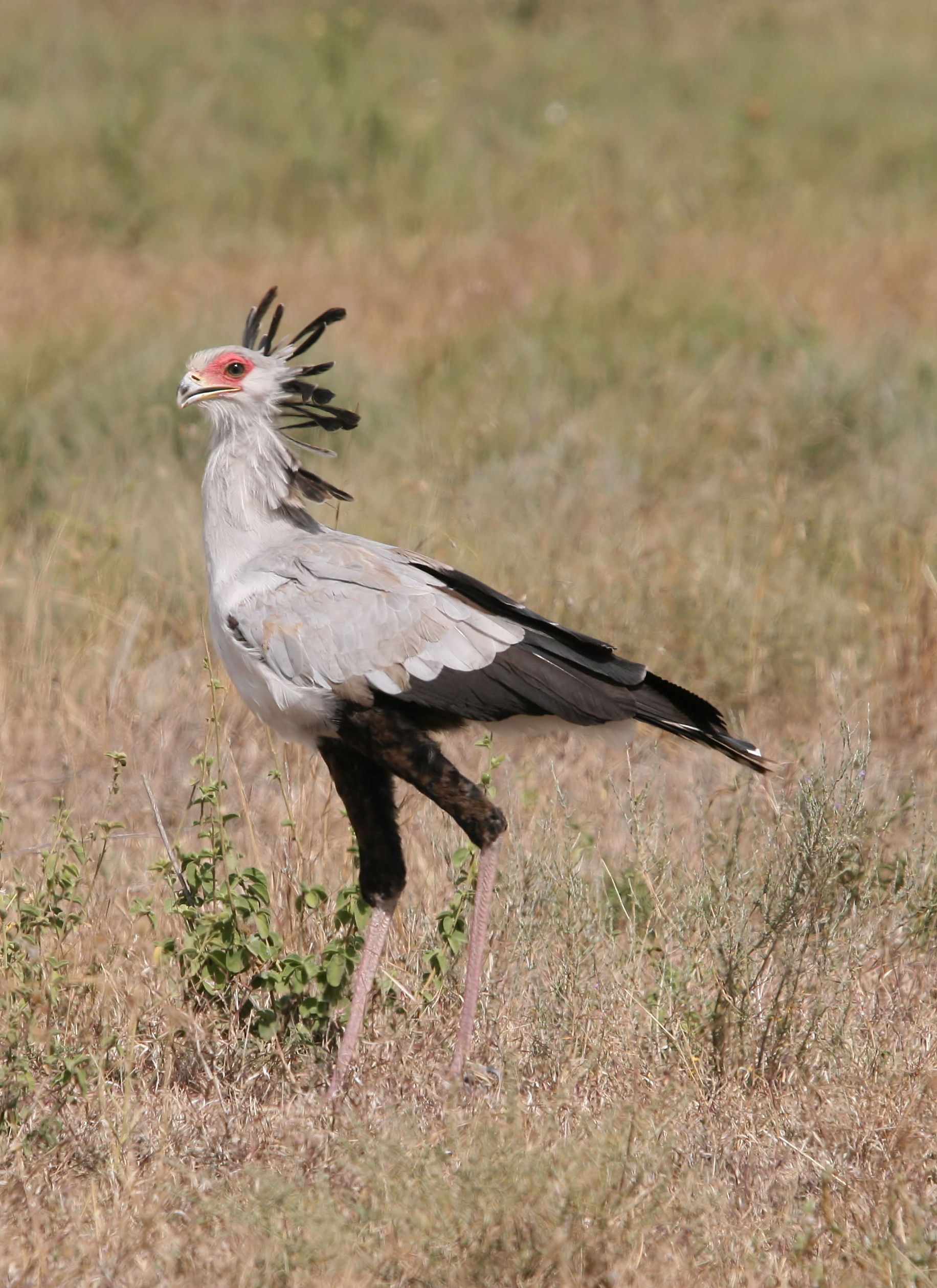
The secretarybird is the largest bird of prey in terms of height and length.

==== Birds of prey (Accipitriformes) ====
- The largest extant species is the Eurasian black vulture (Aegypius monachus). The Eurasian black vulture can attain a weight of 12.5 kg (28 lb), a length of up to 1.2 m (3.9 ft), and a wingspan of 2.95 m (9.7 ft). Other vultures can be almost as large, with the Himalayan vulture (Gyps himalayensis) reaching lengths of up to 1.5 m (4.9 ft).
- The largest living member of this order, in terms of length and height, is the secretarybird (Sagittarius serpentarius) of sub-Saharan Africa. It measures 0.9–1.3 m (3.0–4.3 ft) in height and 1.2–1.5 m (3.9–4.9 ft) in length. Its wingspan can reach 1.2–1.35 m (3.9–4.4 ft) and have a weight of 2.3–4.27 kg (5.1–9.4 lb).
- The largest predatory bird, specifically the largest eagle, is a source of contention.
  - The harpy eagle (Harpia harpyja) of neotropical forests is often cited as the most massive eagle, with wild females up to 10 kg (22 lb) in weight and captive females occasionally growing to weights of over 12 kg (26 lb).
  - The Steller's sea eagle (Haliaeetus pelagicus) of Asia's North Pacific, with unconfirmed weights of up to 12.7 kg (28 lb), and an average weight of 6.7 kg (15 lb), is sometimes regarded as the heaviest eagle.
  - The up to 1.12 m (3.7 ft) Philippine eagle (Pithecophaga jefferyi) has the greatest length of any eagle. The harpy and Philippine eagles, due to having to navigate in deep forest, are relatively short-winged and do not exceed 2 or 2.2 m (6.6 or 7.2 ft), respectively, in wingspan.
  - The golden eagle (Aquila chrysaetos) is of marginally larger wingspan, with the Himalayan subspecies recorded at 2.77 m (9.1 ft).
  - The white-tailed eagle (Haliaeetus albicilla) measures 66–94 cm (26–37 in) in length with a 1.78–2.45 m (5.8–8.0 ft) wingspan. Its wingspan, with a midpoint of 2.18 m (7.2 ft), is on average the largest of any eagle.
  - The white-tailed eagle is sometimes considered the fourth-largest eagle in the world, and is on average the fourth-heaviest.
  - The martial eagle (Polemaetus bellicosus) is the largest eagle in Africa, and the fifth-heaviest (on average) eagle in the world, with a length of 78–96 cm (31–38 in), a weight of 3–6.2 kg (6.6–13.7 lb) and a wingspan of 188–260 cm (6 ft 2 in – 8 ft 6 in).
  - The longest wingspan of an eagle recorded was an Australian wedge-tailed eagle (Aquila audax) at 2.83 m (9.3 ft). However, less substantiated records indicate that the Steller's sea eagle may reach at least 2.74 m (9.0 ft).
- The largest of the accipitrine hawks is the Eurasian goshawk (Accipiter gentilis) of temperate Eurasia. They range in size variably, but on average measure 53–64 cm (21–25 in) in length, have a wingspan of 103–117 cm (3.38–3.84 ft) and weigh 0.63–1.4 kg (1.4–3.1 lb). The Henst's goshawk (Accipiter henstii) and Meyer's goshawk (Accipiter meyerianus) do rival it in terms of wing size and body mass.
- Among the buteonine hawks, the largest species are the ferruginous hawk (Buteo regalis) and the upland buzzard (Buteo hemilasius) of North America and Asia respectively. The former can have a wingspan of 133–142 cm (4.36–4.66 ft), weigh 0.98–2.1 kg (2.2–4.6 lb) and measure 56–69 cm (22–27 in) in length. The weight of the upland buzzard, which can be in the range of 0.95–2.05 kg (2.1–4.5 lb), broadly overlaps that of the ferruginous hawk, even though it is slightly larger at 57–72 cm (22–28 in) long and with a wingspan of 143–161 cm (56–63 in).
- The swamp harrier (Circus approximans) of Australasia is believed to be the largest species of harrier, measuring 50–60 cm (20–24 in) long, having a wingspan of 120–145 cm (47–57 in) and weighing 0.58–1.1 kg (1.3–2.4 lb).
- The largest species of kite is the red kite (Milvus milvus). With a wingspan of 174–179 cm (69–70 in), it measures 60–70 cm (24–28 in) in length and weighs 0.8–1.3 kg (1.8–2.9 lb).

==== Waterfowl (Anseriformes) ====
- The largest waterfowl species by average size is the trumpeter swan (Cygnus buccinator) of Northern North America, which can reach a length of 1.82 m (6.0 ft), a wingspan of 3.1 m (10 ft) and a weight of 17.3 kg (38 lb). The heaviest single waterfowl recorded was a cob (Cygnus olor) from Poland which weighed 23 kg (51 lb), and was allegedly too heavy to take flight.

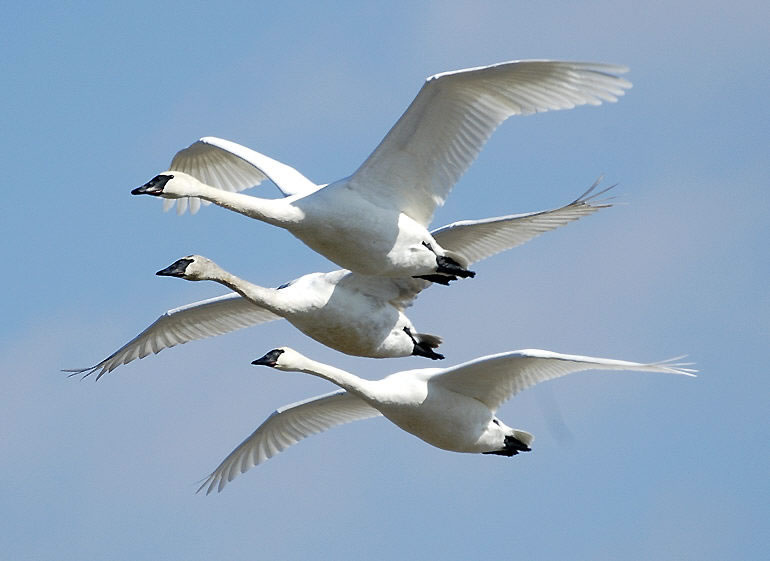
Migrating trumpeter swans are the largest waterfowl.

- The largest species of goose is the Canada goose (Branta canadensis), more specifically the subspecies known as the giant Canada goose (Branta canadensis maxima). Individuals can reach more than 9.1 kg (20 lb) in weight.
- The largest 'duck' species is the Muscovy duck (Cairina moschata) of the Americas. Males can weigh from 4.5–6.3 kg (9.9–13.9 lb) and can measure up to 86 cm (34 in). However, its genus is now considered to be paraphyletic with the species currently being placed in the subfamily Tadorninae (shelducks and shelgeese). If so, the largest species of the true ducks or dabbling ducks (Anatinae) is the mallard (Anas platyrhynchos). They can measure 50–65 cm (20–26 in) in length, have a wingspan of 82–95 cm (32–37 in) and a weight of 1–1.3 kg (2.2–2.9 lb).

==== Swifts and allies (Apodiformes) ====
- The largest species of Apodiformes is the white-naped swift (Streptoprocne semicollaris), endemic to southern Mexico, and the purple needletail (Hirundapus celebensis), of the Philippine islands. Both reach weights of up to 225 g (7.9 oz), lengths of up to 25 cm (9.8 in) and wingspans as long as 0.6 m (2.0 ft).
- Traditionally included in this order, by far the largest hummingbird species is the giant hummingbird (Patagona gigas) of the Andes Mountains. "Giant" is a relative term among the hummingbirds, the smallest-bodied variety of birds, with the giant hummingbird species weighing up to 24 g (0.85 oz) with a length of 23 cm (9.1 in).
- The longest hummingbird species, indeed the longest in the order, is the adult male black-tailed trainbearer (Lesbia victoriae), which can measure up to 25.5 cm (10.0 in). The majority of this length is due to the hummingbird's extreme tail streamers. Another size champion among hummingbirds is the sword-billed hummingbird, a fairly large species of which approximately half of its 21 cm (8.3 in) length derives from its bill. This is by far the largest bill-to-body-size ratio of any bird.

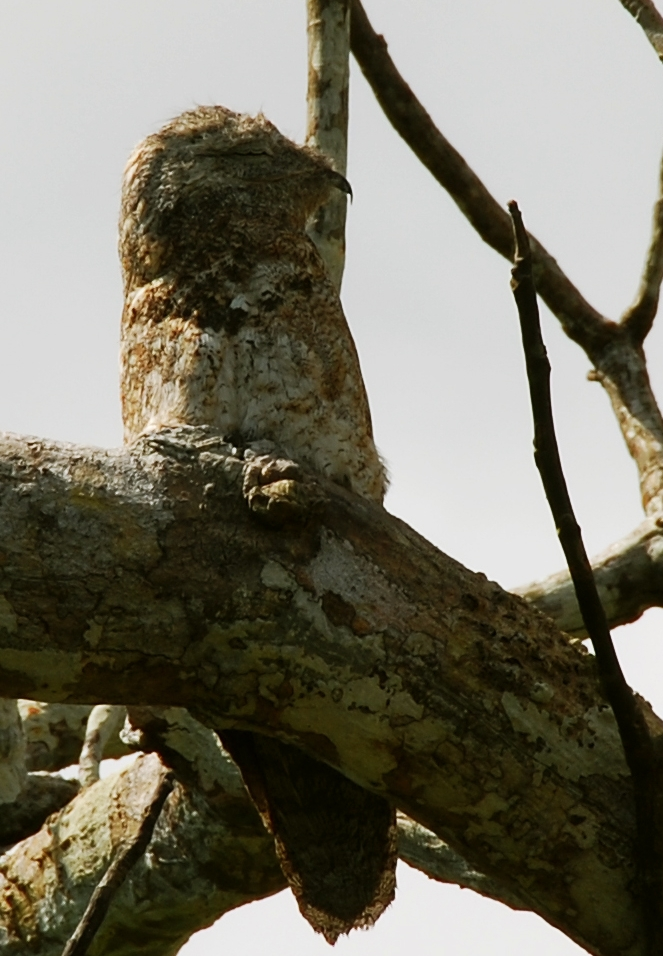
The great potoo is, overall, the largest member of the order Caprimulgiformes.

==== Hornbills, hoopoe, and wood-hoopoes (Bucerotiformes) ====
- The largest species of Coraciiformes is the southern ground hornbill (Bucorvus leadbeateri), which can weigh up to 6.2 kg (14 lb) and grow as long as 1.3 m (4.3 ft). Several arboreal, Asian hornbills can also grow very large, with the great hornbill (Buceros bicornis) weighing up to 4 kg (8.8 lb), and the helmeted hornbill (Rhinoplax vigil) measuring as much as 1.7 m (5.6 ft) in total length. The larger hornbills have a wingspan of up to 1.83 m (6.0 ft).

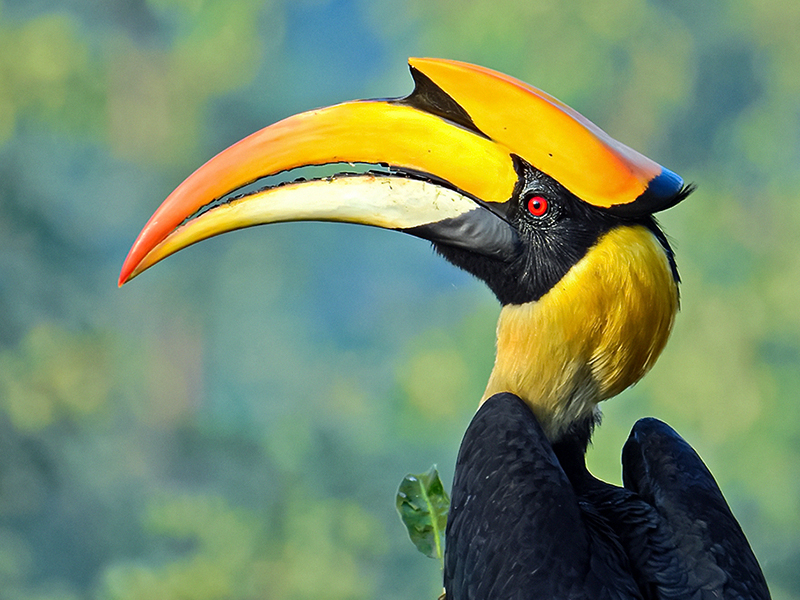
The great hornbill, the largest hornbill of Asia

==== Nightjars and allies (Caprimulgiformes) ====
- The largest species of this order of nocturnal birds is the neotropical great potoo (Nycitbius grandis), which can grow to a weight of 680 g (1.50 lb) and a height of 60 cm (2.0 ft). Heavier Caprimulgiformes have been recorded in juvenile specimens of the Australian tawny frogmouth (Podargus strigoides), which can weigh up to 1.4 kg (3.1 lb). Other species nearly as large as the potoo are the Papuan frogmouth (Podargus papuensis) of New Guinea and the neotropic, cave-dwelling oilbird (Steatornis caripensis), both growing as large as 48 cm (19 in). The wingspan of the great potoo and the oilbird can be more than 1 m (3.3 ft), the largest of the order.
- The largest species of the nightjar family, the great eared nightjar (Eurostopodus macrotis) of East Asia, is of smaller proportions. Great eared nightjars can reach 150 g (0.33 lb) in weight and 41 cm (16 in) in height.

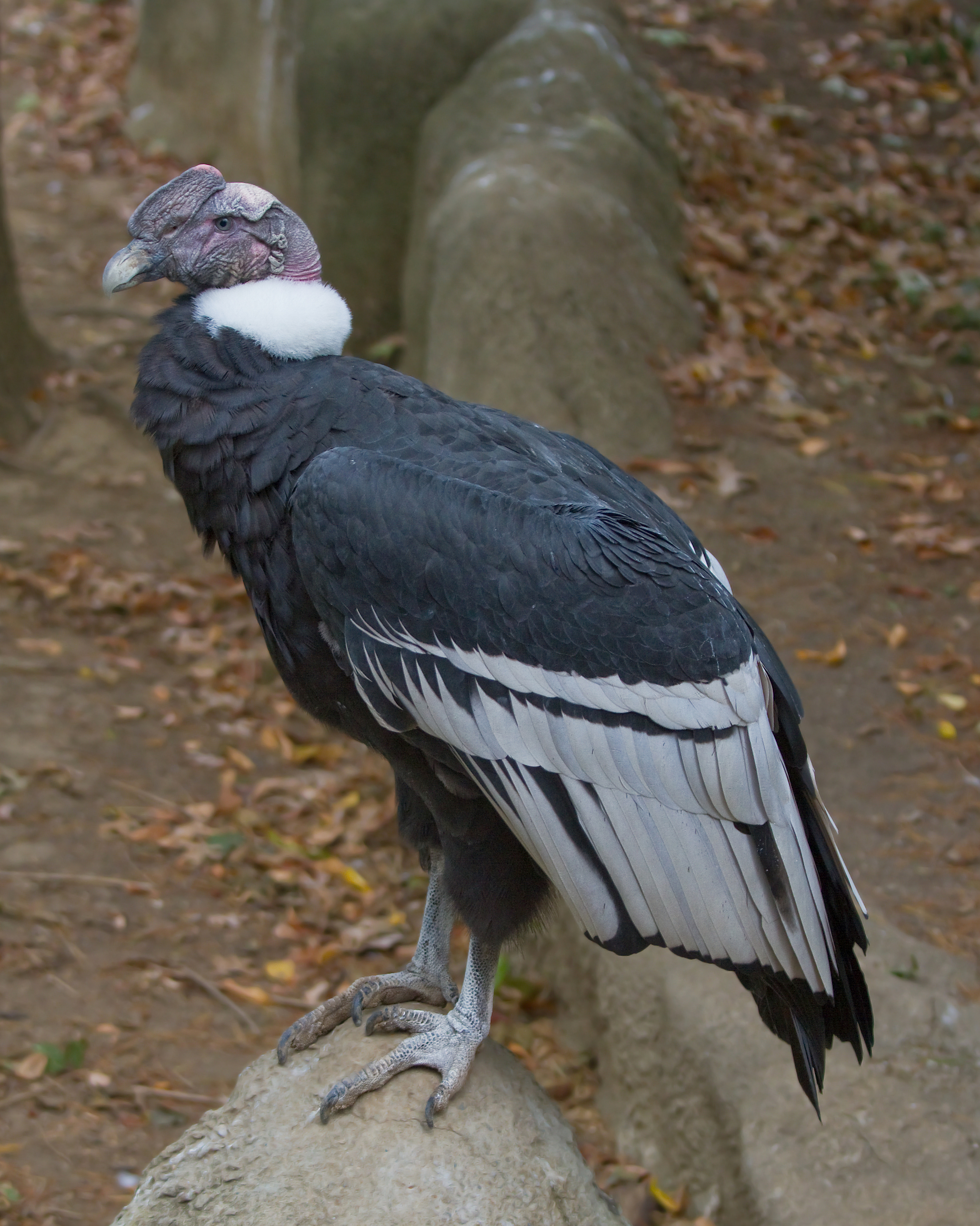
The Andean condor is the largest living bird of prey.

==== New World vultures (Cathartiformes) ====
- Though historically considered to be Accipitriformes, New World vultures are now generally considered to be their own separate order. The largest species of this order, based on body weight and wingspan, is the Andean condor (Vultur gryphus) of western South America. The Andean condor can reach a wingspan of 3.2 m (10 ft) and a weight of 15 kg (33 lb). Males are larger than females. The California condor is marginally smaller with a maximum weight of 14 kg.
  - The heaviest known flying bird, Argentavis magnificens, is a teratorn, extinct close relatives to the New World vultures. It is believed to have reached around 70 kg (154 lb), with wingspan estimates ranging from 5.09 to 7.5 metres (16 ft 8 in to 24 ft 7 in).

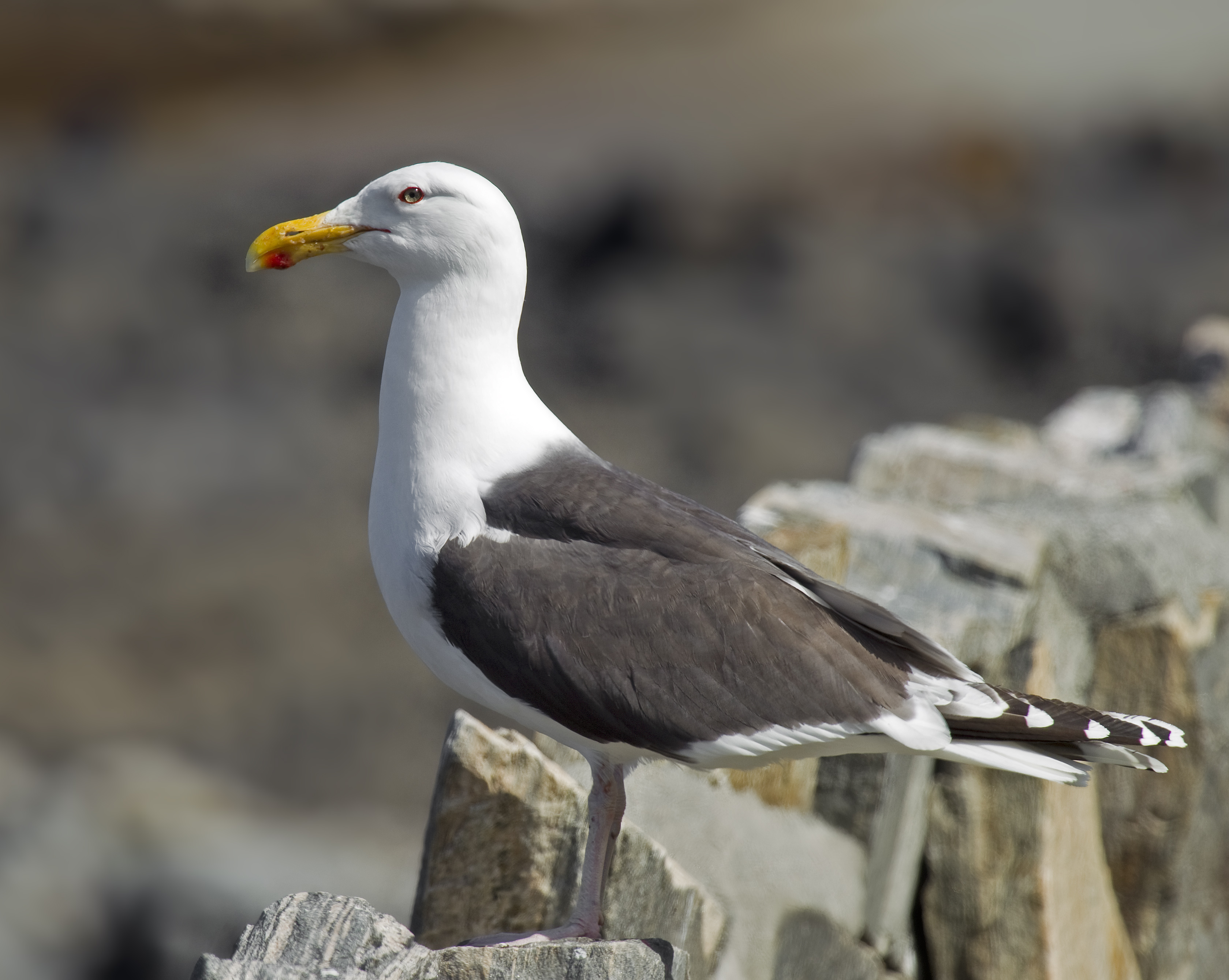
The great black-backed gull, the largest of the gulls

==== Shorebirds (Charadriiformes) ====
- The largest species in this diverse order is the great black-backed gull (Larus marinus) of the North Atlantic, attaining a height as large as 0.79 m (2.6 ft), a wingspan of 1.7 m (5.6 ft) and a weight of up to 2.3 kg (5.1 lb). The glaucous gull (L. hyperboreus) is smaller on average than the black-back but has been weighed as heavy as 2.7 kg (6.0 lb).
- Among the most prominent family of "small waders", the sandpipers reach their maximum size in the Far Eastern curlew (Numenius madagascariensis) at up to 0.60 m (2.0 ft) in length and 1.1 m (3.6 ft) across the wings. The more widespread Eurasian curlew (N. arquata) can weigh up to 1.36 kg (3.0 lb).
- Less variable in size, the largest species of plovers is the Australasian masked lapwing (Vanellus miles) which grows up to 0.4 m (1.3 ft) long with a 0.85 m (2.8 ft) wingspan and a weight of 400 g (14 oz). The widely distributed Caspian tern (Hydroprogne caspia), is relatively large and heavily built. Caspians can range up to 782 g (1.724 lb) in weight, with a 1.4 m (4.6 ft) wingspan and a length of 0.6 m (2.0 ft).
- The largest extant alcid is the sub-Arctic thick-billed murre (Uria lomvia), which can weigh up to 1.48 kg (3.3 lb), with a length of 0.48 m (1.6 ft) and a wingspan of 0.76 m (2.5 ft). However, until its extinction, the flightless great auk (Pinguinus impennis) of the North Atlantic was both the largest alcid and the second-largest member of the order. Great auks could range up to 6.8 kg (15 lb) and 0.9 m (3.0 ft) tall, but were generally around 5 kg (11 lb) and 75 cm (30 in) tall.
- Miomancalla howardi was the largest charadriiform of all time, weighing approximately 5.4 kg (12 lb) with a height of approximately 1 m (3.3 ft).

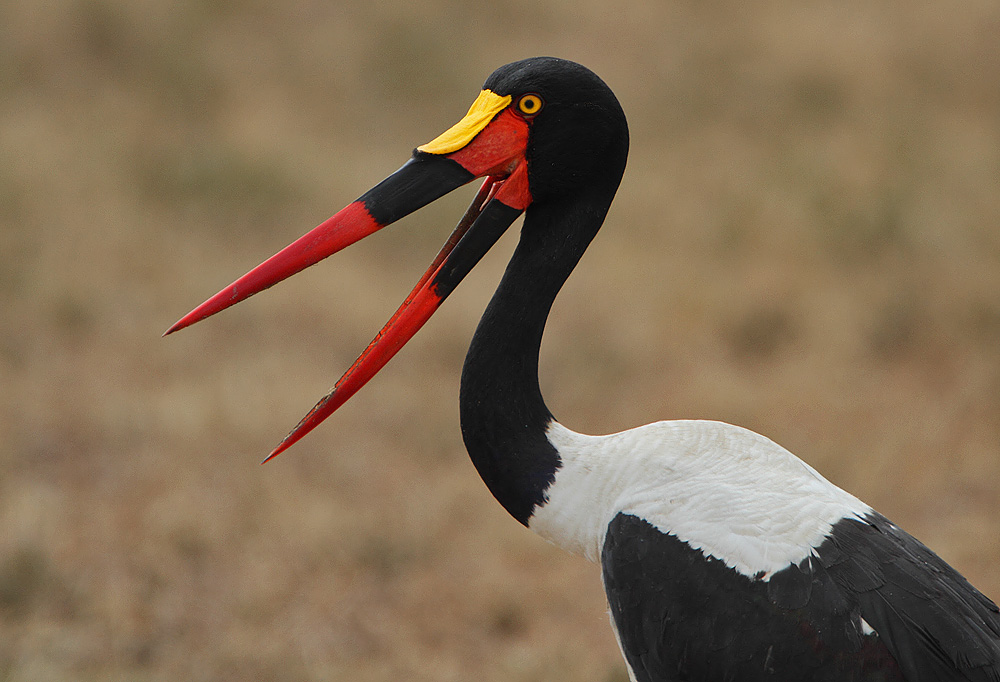
The saddle-billed stork is perhaps the tallest of the storks.

==== Storks (Ciconiiformes) ====
- The longest-bodied and tallest species in this order is the saddle-billed stork of Africa (Ephippiorhynchus senegalensis), which often exceeds 1.5 m (4.9 ft) tall and has a wingspan of up to 2.7 m (8.9 ft). Reaching a similar height but more heavily built among the storks are the neotropical jabiru (Jabiru mycteria), the Asian greater adjutant (Leptoptilos dubius) and the African marabou stork (L. crumenifer), all of which weigh up to 8 to 9 kg (18 to 20 lb). The greater adjutant and marabou nearly equal the Andean condor in maximum wingspan, with all three birds believed to reach or exceed a wingspan of 3.16 m (10.4 ft).

==== Mousebirds (Coliiformes) ====
- The largest mousebird species, the speckled mousebird (Colius striatus), weighs 2 ounces (57 g) with a height of over 14 inches (36 cm).

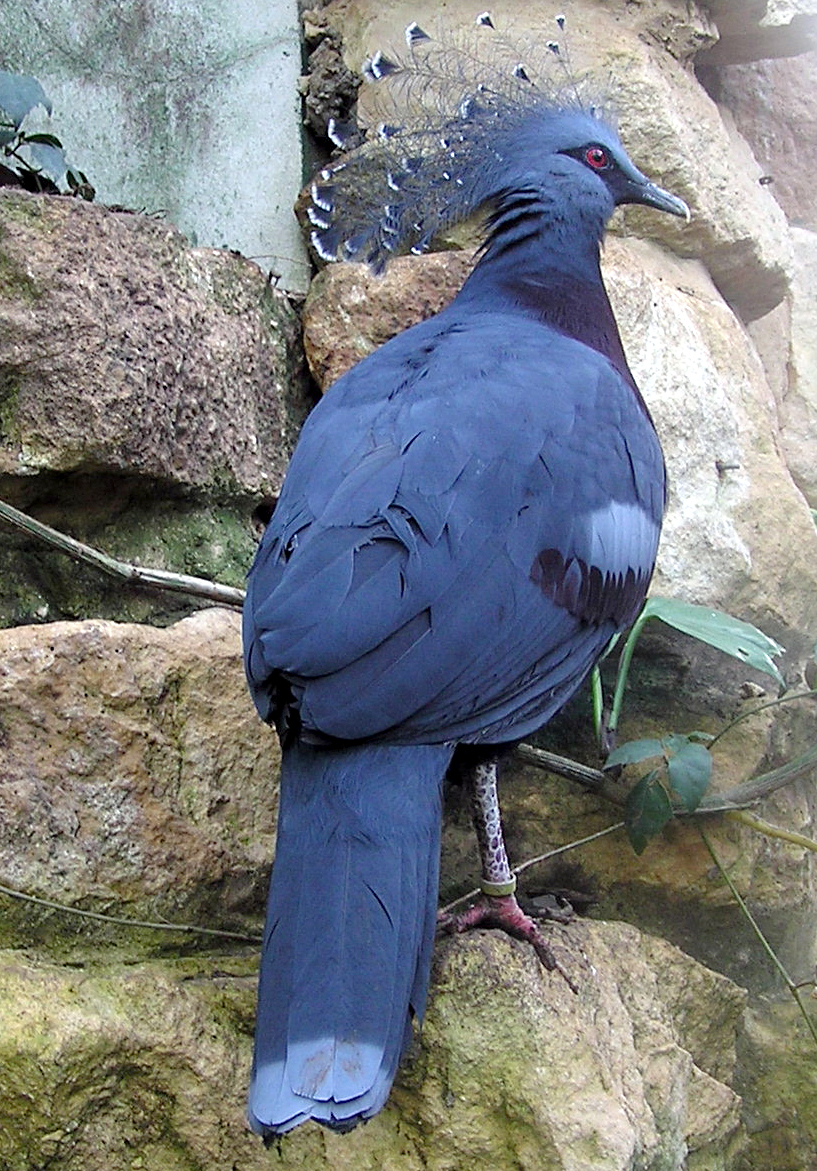
The Victoria crowned pigeon is the largest living pigeon.

==== Pigeons (Columbiformes) ====
- The largest species of the pigeon/dove complex is the Victoria crowned pigeon (Goura victoria) of Northern New Guinea. Some exceptionally large Victoria crowned pigeons have reached 3.7 kg (8.2 lb) and 85 cm (33 in). The largest arboreal pigeon is the Marquesan imperial pigeon (Ducula galeata), which can grow approximately 0.8 m (2.6 ft) across the wings and can weigh 1 kg (2.2 lb).
- The largest pigeons and doves known to have existed were the dodo (Raphus cucullatus) and the Rodrigues solitaire (Pezophaps solitaria). Both flightless species may have exceeded 1 m (3.3 ft) in height. The dodo is frequently cited as the largest pigeon, potentially weighing as much as 28 kg (62 lb), although recent estimates have indicated that an average wild dodo weighed much less at approximately 10.2 kg (22 lb).

==== Rollers, Kingfishers, Bee-eaters, motmots, and todies (Coraciiformes) ====
- The largest kingfisher is the giant kingfisher (Megaceryle maxima), at up to 48 cm (19 in) long and 425 g (15.0 oz) in weight. The common Australian species, the laughing kookaburra (Dacelo novaeguineae), may be heavier still, as individuals exceeding 450 g (0.99 lb) are not uncommon. A kookaburra's wingspan can range up to 0.9 m (3.0 ft).
- The largest motmot is the rufous motmot (Baryphthengus martii) 42 to 47 cm (17 to 19 in) long and weighing 146 to 160 g (5.1 to 5.6 oz).
- The largest bee-eater is the blue-bearded bee-eater (Nyctyornis athertoni) 31 to 35 cm (12 to 14 in) in length and weighing 70 to 93 g (2.5 to 3.3 oz). This species has a large sickle shaped bill and a square ended tail lacks the "wires" that are typical of smaller bee-eaters. The bird is grass green with a turquoise forehead, face and chin. The feathers of the throat are elongated giving it a bearded appearance when they are fluffed out. The belly is yellowish to olive with streaks of green or blue. The peninsular Indian populations are said to be paler green than the northeast Indian populations. Although males and females appear similar, the blue throat feathers of the male show higher ultraviolet reflectivity than those of the female.

==== Cuckoos, coucals and roadrunners (Cuculiformes) ====
- The largest of the cuckoos is the Australasian channel-billed cuckoo (Scythrops novaehollandiae), which can range up to a weight of 0.93 kg (2.1 lb), a 1 m (3.3 ft) wingspan and a length of 0.66 m (2.2 ft).
- The largest roadrunners are greater roadrunners (Geococcyx californianus) 52–62 cm (20–24 in) long, with a 43–61 cm (17–24 in) wingspan and weighing 221–538 g (7.8–19.0 oz). It stands around 25–30 cm (9 3/4–11 3/4 in) tall and is the largest cuckoo of the Americas. The upper body is mostly brown with black streaks and sometimes pink spots. The neck and upper breast are white or pale brown with dark brown streaks, and the belly is white. A crest of brown feathers sticks up on the head, and a bare patch of orange and blue skin lies behind each eye;
- The largest turaco is the great blue turaco (Corythaeola cristata) 70–76 cm (28–30 in) in length with a mass of 800–1,231 g (1.764–2.714 lb).
- The largest coucal is the greater coucal (Centropus sinensis) at 48 cm.

==== Falcons (Falconiformes) ====
- Many authorities now support the split of falcons from the Accipitriformes, despite similar adaptations, due to the genetic evidence showing they are not closely related. The largest species of falcon is the gyrfalcon (Falco rusticolus). Large females of this species can range up to 2.1 kg (4.6 lb), span 1.6 m (5.2 ft) across the wings and measure 0.66 m (2.2 ft) long.

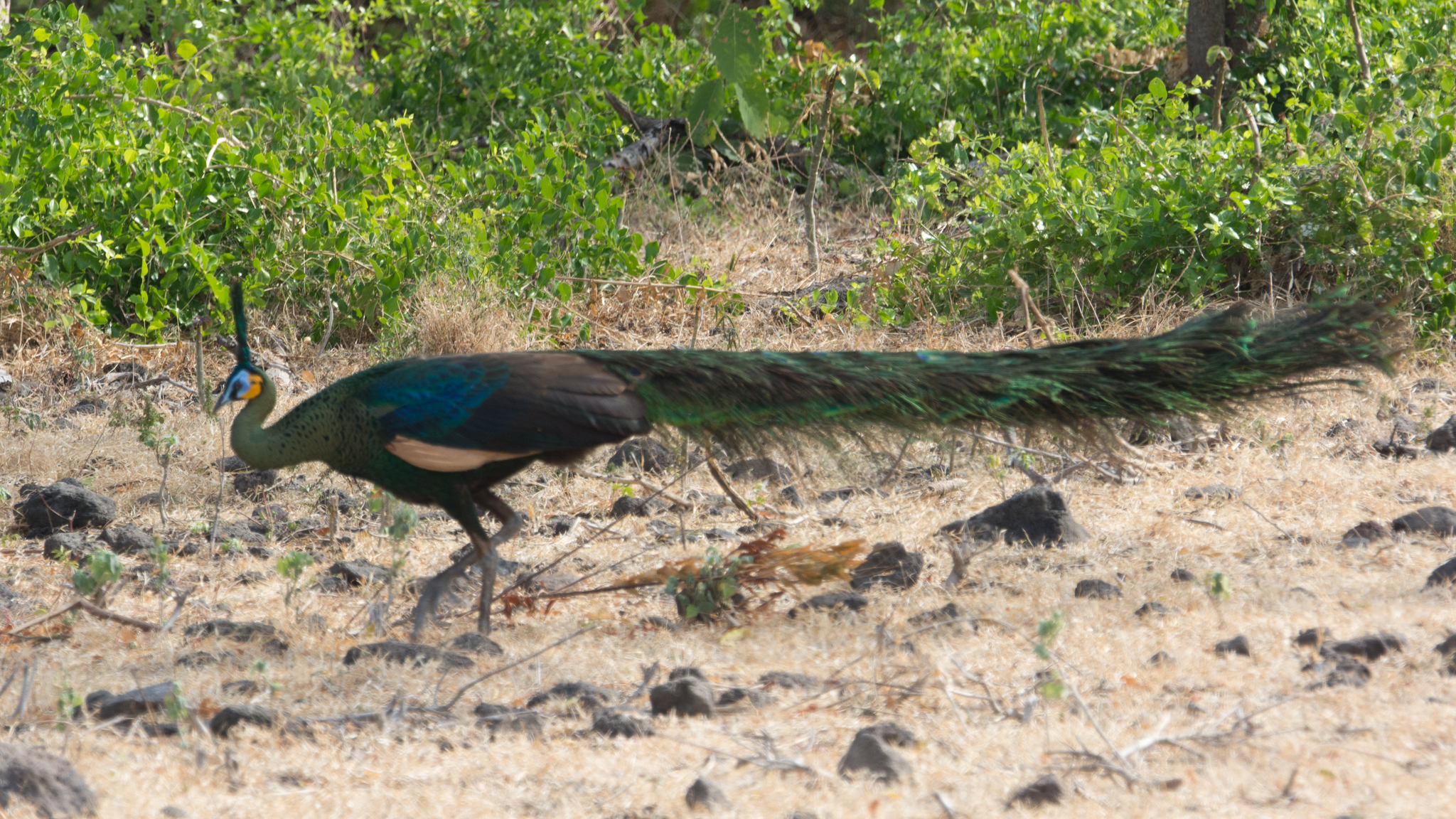
The green peafowl is one of the longest galliforms in length.

==== Gamebirds (Galliformes) ====
- The heaviest member of this order is the North American wild turkey (Meleagris gallopavo). The largest specimen recorded was shot in 2015, and weighed 17.05 kg (37.6 lb). The heaviest domesticated turkey on record weighed 37 kg (82 lb).
- The largest member of the grouse family is the Eurasian western capercaillie (Tetrao urogallus), weighing up to 6.7 kg (15 lb) with a length of 1 m (3.3 ft).
- The longest galliform species, if measured from the tip of the bill to the end of the tail coverts, is the male green peafowl (Pavo muticus) of Southeast Asia at a length of up to 3 m (9.8 ft), with two-thirds of the length being made up by the tail coverts. It has a relatively large wingspan for a gamebird, spanning as much as 1.6 m (5.2 ft) across the wings.
- The largest pheasant, the great argus (Argusianus argus), is 160–200 cm (63–79 in) in total length, including a tail of 105–143 cm (41–56 in), and weighing 2.04–2.72 kg (4.5–6.0 lb).
- The largest cracid, the great curassow (Crax rubra), is 78–100 cm (31–39 in) in length and 3.1–4.8 kg (6.8–10.6 lb) in weight. Females are somewhat smaller than males. It is the most massive and heavy species in the family, but its length is matched by a few other cracids.
- A prehistoric, flightless family, sometimes called (incorrectly) "giant megapodes" (Sylviornis) of New Caledonia were the most massive galliforms, with lengths of up to 1.7 m (5.6 ft) weights up to approximately 40 kg (88 lb).

==== Loons (Gaviiformes) ====
- The largest species on average is the yellow-billed loon (Gavia adamsii) of the Arctic, at up to 1 m (3.3 ft) and 7 kg (15 lb). One exceptionally large North American common loon (Gavia immer) was weighed at 8 kg (18 lb), heavier than any recorded yellow-billed loon. Wingspans of the largest loons can reach 1.52 m (5.0 ft).

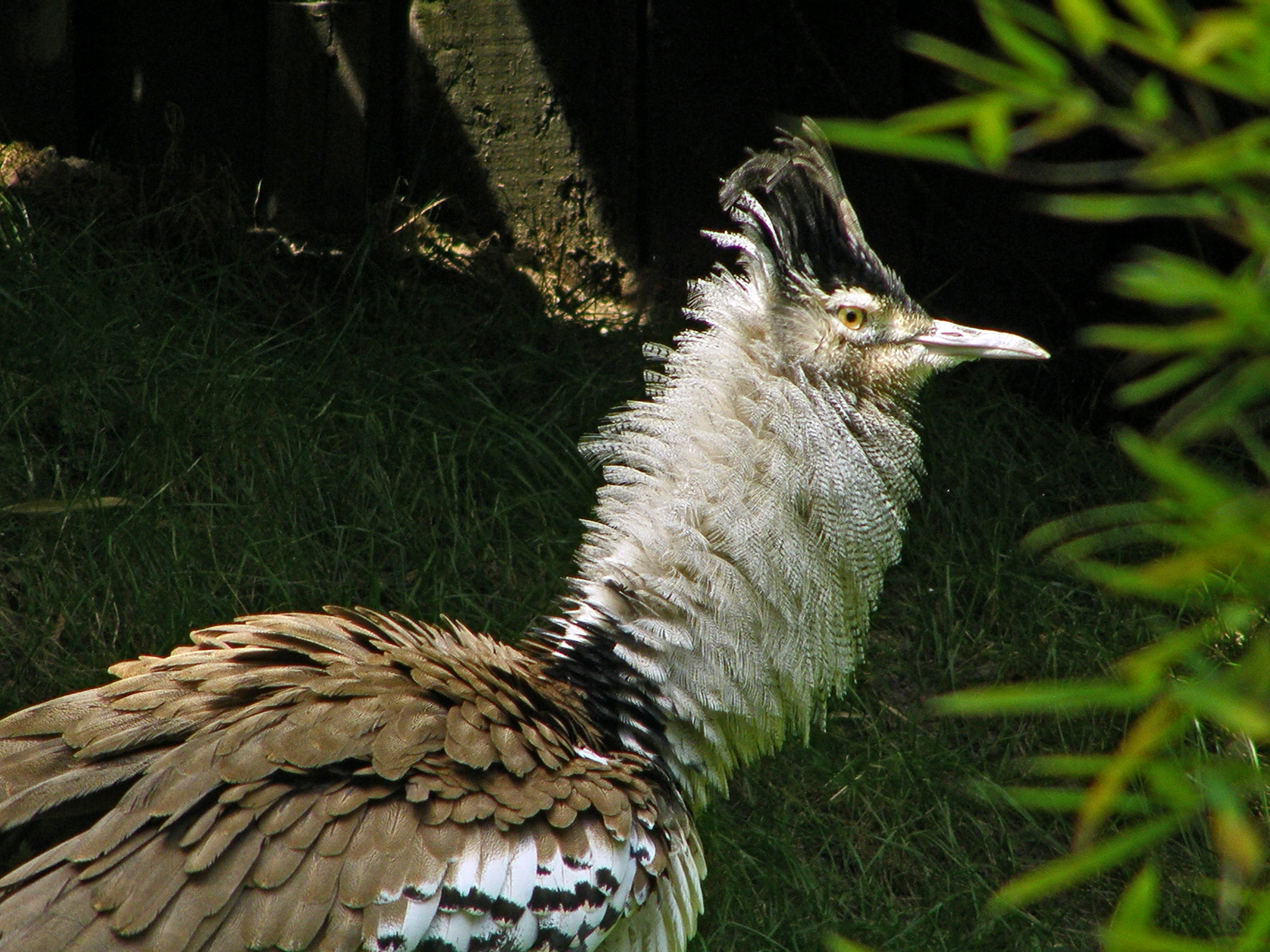
Alongside the great bustard, the Kori bustard is the heaviest extant flying bird.

==== Cranes and allies (Gruiformes) ====
- The males of the Eurasian great bustard (Otis tarda) and the African kori bustard (Ardeotis kori) are the heaviest birds capable of flight, averaging up to 16 kg (35 lb) and weighing 2 to 3 times as much as their female counterparts. It is not resolved if one of these species is larger than the other, but both can reach a weight of at least 21 kg (46 lb) and measure up to 1.53 m (5.0 ft) long. Some kori bustards have been reported from 23 kg (51 lb) to even 40 kg (88 lb), but all such reports are unverified or dubious.
- The tallest flying bird on earth, also represented in the Gruiformes, is the sarus crane (Grus antigone) of Southern Asia and Australia, which can reach a height of 2 m (6.6 ft). Heavier cranes are reported in other species, the red-crowned crane (Grus japonensis) and the Siberian crane (G. leucogeranus), both from Northeast Asia and both at up to 15 kg (33 lb), as opposed to a top weight of 12.8 kg (28 lb) in the sarus. Wingspan in both the largest cranes and the largest bustards can range up to 2.5–3 m (8.2–9.8 ft).
- The most species-rich family in this order, the rails, reaches their largest size in the bulky takahē (Porphyrio hochstetteri) of New Zealand, an endangered species that can weigh up to 4.2 kg (9.3 lb) and measure 0.65 m (2.1 ft) long. The aforementioned "terror bird", Brontornis burmeisteri, has traditionally been classified as a member of this order, although this may not be an accurate classification.

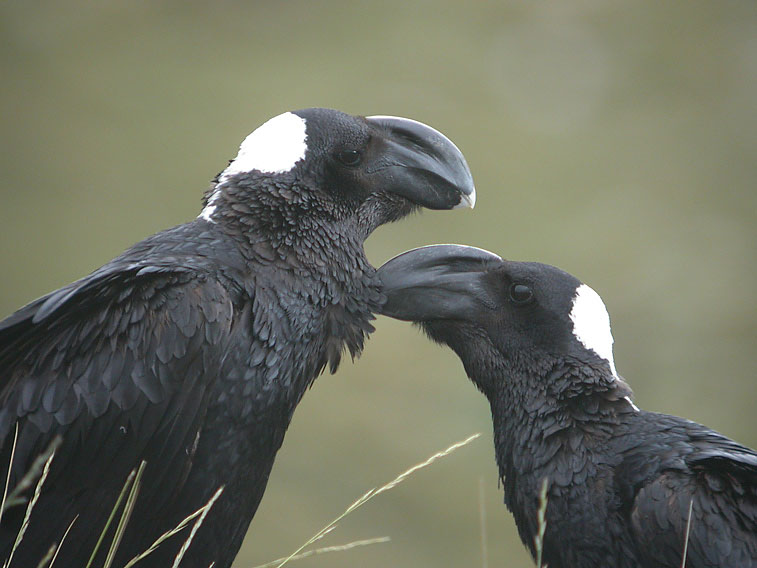
The thick-billed raven shares the title of the largest songbird with its common cousin.

==== Hoatzin (Opisthocomiformes) ====
- Hoatzin (Opisthocomus hoazin), the only member of its order, is a pheasant-sized South American bird, with a total length of 65 cm (26 in) and a maximum weight of 1 kg (2.2 lb).

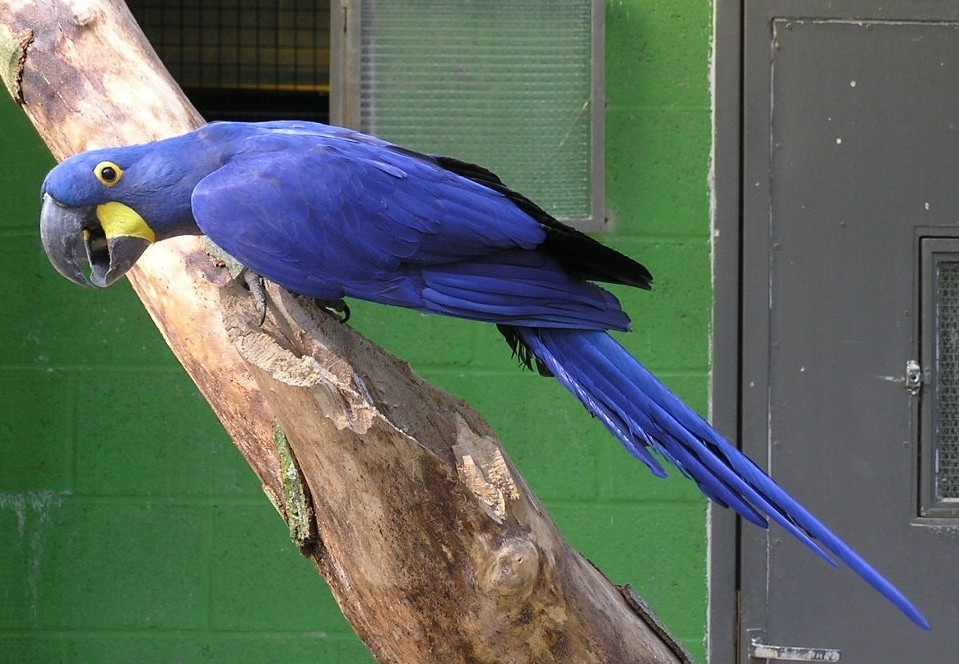
The hyacinth macaw is the largest parrot.

==== Songbirds (Passeriformes) ====
- The passerine or songbird order comprises more than half of all bird species, and are known for their generally small size, their strong voices and their frequent perching. Corvids are the largest of passerines, particularly the large races of the common raven (Corvus corax) and the Northeast African thick-billed raven (C. crassirostris). Large ravens can weigh 2 kg (4.4 lb), attain a 1.5 m (4.9 ft) wingspan and measure 0.8 m (2.6 ft) long.
- The closest non-corvid contender to largest size is the Australian superb lyrebird (Menura novaehollandiae), which can reach a length of 1 m (3.3 ft), much of it comprised by their spectacular tail, and a weight of 1 kg (2.2 lb).
- The largest species in the most species-rich passerine family, Tyrannidae or tyrant-flycatchers, is the great shrike-tyrant of the South Andes (Agriornis lividus), at 99.2 g (3.50 oz) and 31 cm (12 in), although the fork-tailed flycatcher (Tyrannus savana), to 41 cm (16 in), is longer thanks to its extreme tail.
- The namesake of the previous family, the Old World flycatchers, reaches its maximum size in the blue whistling thrush of India Southeast Asia (Myophonus caeruleus), if it is indeed a proper member of the family, at up to 122 g (4.3 oz) and a length of 29 cm (11 in).
- Closely related to the Old World flycatchers, the thrush family's largest representative is the great thrush of South America (Turdus fuscater), at up to 175 g (6.2 oz) and 28 to 33 cm (11 to 13 in).
- The largest bird family in Eurasia is the Old World warblers. As previously classified these warblers could get fairly large, up to 57 g (2.0 oz) and 28 cm (11 in) in the striated grassbird of Southeast Asia (Megalurus palustris). The Old World warblers have been split into several families, however, which leaves the barred warbler of central Eurasia (Sylvia nisoria), up to 36 g (1.3 oz) and 17 cm (6.7 in), as the largest "true warbler".
- Not to be confused with the previous family, the largest of the well-known New World warblers is the aberrant yellow-breasted chat (Icteria virens), which can exceptionally measure up to 22 cm (8.7 in) and weigh 53 g (1.9 oz).
- Another large family is the bulbuls, the largest of which is the south Asian straw-headed bulbul (Pycnonotus zeylanicus), to 94 g (3.3 oz) and 29 cm (11 in). The diverse, large family of babblers can reach 35 cm (14 in) and 170 g (6.0 oz) in the south Asian greater necklaced laughingthrush (Garrulax pectoralis).
- The familiar domesticated species, the Java sparrow (Padda oryzivora), is (in the wild) the largest estrildid, at up to 28.3 g (1.00 oz) and 17 cm (6.7 in). The largest honeyeater, perhaps the most diverse Australasian bird family, is the crow honeyeater (Gymnomyza aubryana), at up to 290 g (10 oz) and 30 cm (12 in). The largest of the "true finches" is the collared grosbeak (Mycerobas affinis) of central and south Asia at up to 23 cm (9.1 in) and 80 g (2.8 oz).
- Among the largest bird families, the emberizids, reaches its largest size in the Abert's towhee (Pipilo aberti) of Southwest United States and north Mexico at up to 23 cm (9.1 in) and 80 g (2.8 oz).
- Closely related to the previous family is the tanagers, which can range up to 140 g (4.9 oz) in the Andean-forest-dwelling white-capped tanager (Sericossypha albocristata). Another species-rich neotropical family is the ovenbirds, the largest of which, the great rufous woodcreeper (Xiphocolaptes major) of the Amazonian rainforest, can weigh up to 162 g (5.7 oz) and 35 cm (14 in). The specialized antbird family can range up to 156 g (5.5 oz) and 35.5 cm (14.0 in) in the giant antshrike (Batara cinerea). Among the most variably sized passerine families is the icterids.
- The largest icterid is the olive oropendola (Psarocolius bifasciatus), in which males can range up to 52 cm (1.71 ft) and 550 g (1.21 lb). The latter species competes with the similarly sized Amazonian umbrellabird (Cephalopterus ornatus) as the largest passerine in South America.

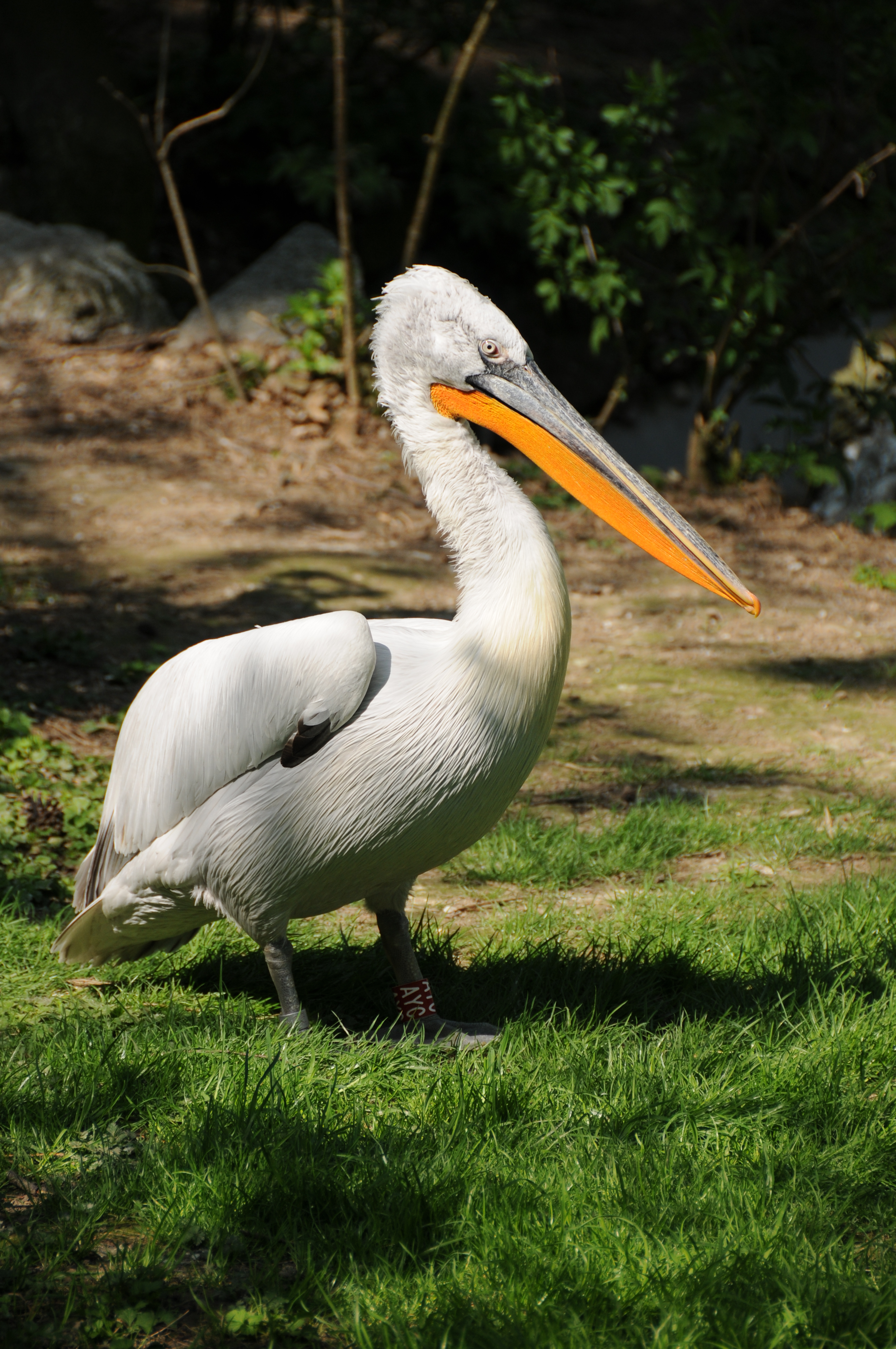
The Dalmatian pelican is one of the largest flying birds.

==== Pelicans and allies (Pelecaniformes) ====
- Pelicans rank amongst the largest flying birds. The largest species of pelican on average is the Eurasian Dalmatian pelican (Pelecanus crispus), which can attain a maximum length of 1.8 m (5.9 ft), a body weight of 13 kg (29 lb) and a wingspan of 3.45 m (11.3 ft). The males of the great white pelican (P. onocrotalus) of Eurasia and Africa are heavier on average, at 11.45 kg (25.2 lbs) but due to a greater degree of sexual dimorphism, it averages slightly lower than the Dalmatian pelican overall. The largest wild pelican was a male great white pelican, at 15 kg (33 lbs), followed by the American white pelican and Australian pelican at 13.6 kg (30 lbs) and 13 kg (29 lbs) respectively. The Australian pelican has the largest bill of any bird, at as much as 50 cm (20 in) long, and with its bill, it can achieve lengths similar to or even greater than the Dalmatian pelican. A large great white pelican can attain a wingspan of 3.6 m (12 ft), second only to the great albatrosses among all living birds.
- Standing up to 1.53 m (5.0 ft), with a wingspan of up to 2.3 m (7.5 ft) and a weight up to 5 kg (11 lb), the African goliath heron (Ardea goliath) is the largest of the herons and egrets. Juvenile white-bellied heron (A. insignis) have been reported to weigh up to 8.5 kg (19 lb) with heights of 1.58 m (5.2 ft). The largest shoebill (Balaeniceps rex) has a typical height range of 110 to 140 cm (43 to 55 in) with some specimens reaching as much as 152 cm (60 in). Length from tail to beak can range from 100 to 140 cm (39 to 55 in) and wingspan is 230 to 260 cm (7 ft 7 in to 8 ft 6 in). Weight has reportedly ranged from 4 to 7 kg (8.8 to 15.4 lb). A male weighs around 5.6 kg (12 lb) and is larger than a typical female of 4.9 kg (11 lb). The signature feature of the species is its huge, bulbous bill,
- The largest spoonbills are the royal spoonbills (Platalea regia) 80 cm (31 in) tall, 74–81 cm (29–32 in) and a weight of 1.4–2.07 kg (3.1–4.6 lb). The roseate spoonbill (Platalea ajaja) is 71–86 cm (28–34 in) long, with a 120–133 cm (47–52 in) wingspan and a body mass of 1.2–1.8 kg (2.6–4.0 lb).
- The largest ibis is the giant ibis (Thaumatibis gigantea). Adults can grow to 102–106 cm (40–42 in) long, with a standing height of up to 100 cm (39 in) and are estimated to weigh approximately 4.2 kg (9.3 lb). Among standard measurements, the wing chord is 52.3–57 cm (20.6–22.4 in), the tail is 30 cm (12 in), the tarsus is 11 cm (4.3 in) and the culmen is 20.8–23.4 cm (8.2–9.2 in). The crested ibis (Nipponia nippon) of Japan is as large as 78.5 cm (30.9 in) in height and 30.9 cm (12.2 in) in length.

==== Cormorants, Frigatebirds, Gannets, Boobies, and Darters (Suliformes) ====
- The largest of the cormorants is the flightless cormorant of the Galapagos Islands (Nannopterum harrisi), at up to 5 kg (11 lb) and 1 m (3.3 ft), although large races in the great cormorant (Phalacrocorax carbo) can weigh up to 5.3 kg (12 lb). The spectacled cormorant of the North Pacific (Urile perspicillatus), which became extinct around 1850, was larger still, averaging around 6.4 kg (14 lb) and 1.15 m (3.8 ft).
- The widely distributed magnificent frigatebird is of note for having an extremely large wingspan, up to 2.5 m (8.2 ft), for its relatively light body, at up to only 1.9 kg (4.2 lb).
- The largest of species booby the Masked booby (Sula dactylatra) 75 to 85 cm (30 to 33 in) long, with a 160–170 cm (63–67 in) wingspan and 1.2–2.2 kg (2.6–4.9 lb) weight. It has a typical sulid body shape, with a long pointed bill, long neck, aerodynamic body, long slender wings and pointed tail.
- The largest gannets Northern gannet (Sula bassanus) It is 87–100 cm (34 1/2–39 1/2 in) long with a 170–180 cm (67–71 in) wingspan.

==== Tropicbirds (Phaethontiformes) ====
- The largest tropicbirds is the red-billed tropicbird (Phaethon aethereus). The adult is a slender, mainly white bird, 48 cm long, excluding the central tail feathers which double the total length, and a one metre wingspan.

==== Flamingos (Phoenicopteriformes) ====
- The largest flamingo is the greater flamingo (Phoenicopterus roseus) of Eurasia and Africa. One of the tallest flying birds in existence when standing upright (exceeded only by the tallest cranes), this species typically weighs 3.5 kg (7.7 lb) and stands up to 1.53 m (5.0 ft) tall. At maximum, a male can weigh up to 4.55 kg (10.0 lb) and stand as high as 1.87 m (6.1 ft). Wingspan is relatively small in flamingos, ranging up to 1.65 m (5.4 ft).

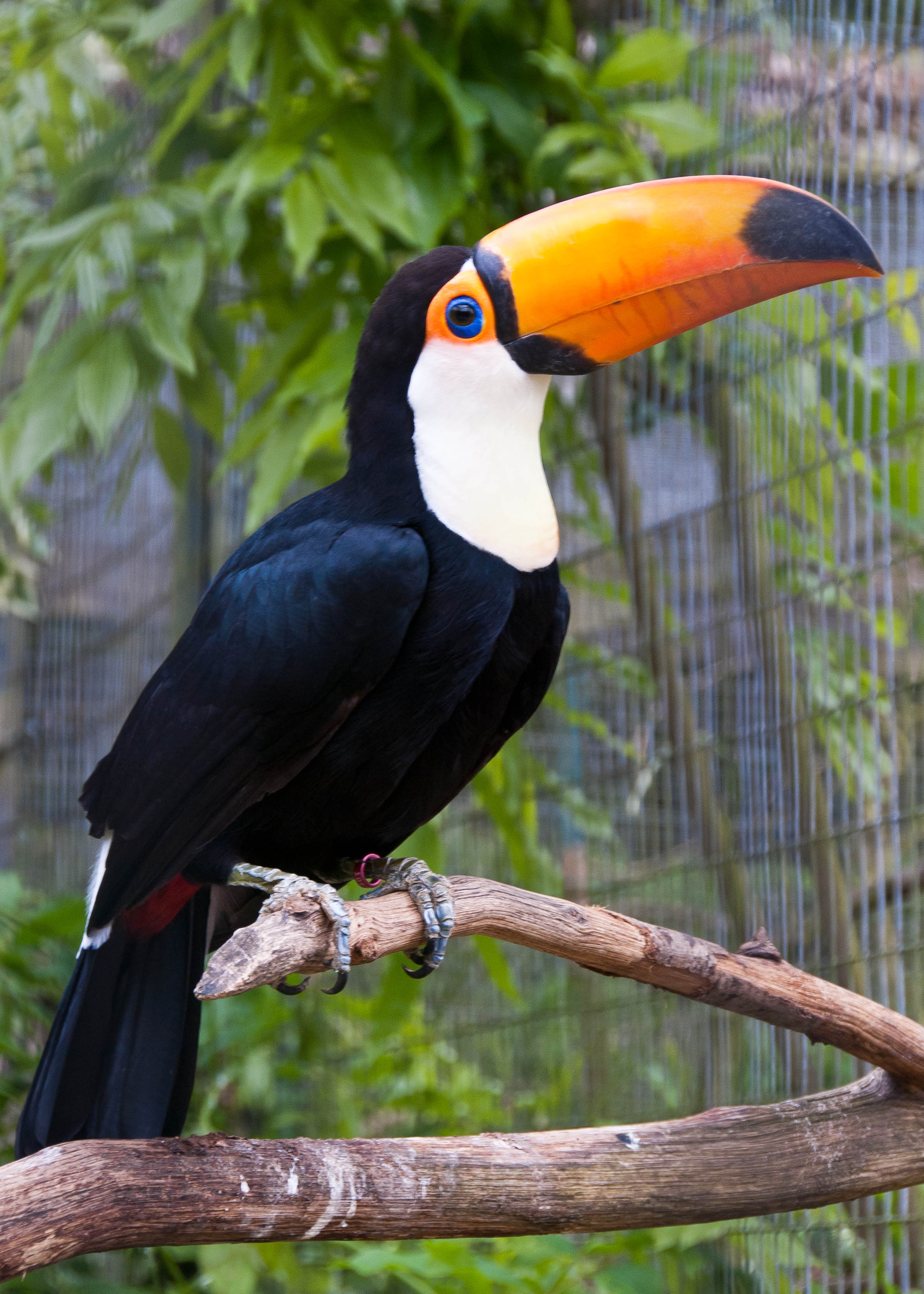
The toco toucan is the largest species in the order Piciformes as well as one of the most colourful.

==== Woodpeckers and allies (Piciformes) ====
- The largest species of this order is the toco toucan (Ramphastos toco) of the neotropic forest. Large specimens of this toucan can weigh to 870 g (1.92 lb) and 0.65 m (2.1 ft), at which size the beak alone can measure approximately 20 cm (7.9 in).
- Until the 20th century, the largest woodpecker was the imperial woodpecker (Campephilus imperialis) of Mexico, with a length of up to 0.6 m (2.0 ft). This species is generally believed to have gone extinct following habitat destruction and hunting. The closely related ivory-billed woodpecker (Campephilus principalis) of the Southeast United States and Cuba approached similar sizes at up to 0.5 m (1.6 ft) in length, with a wingspan of 0.78 m (2.6 ft) and a mass of at least 530 g (1.17 lb). Despite possibilities that it has survived in some deep swamp forests in Arkansas or Florida, the ivory-billed is also generally considered to have gone extinct. The great slaty woodpecker (Mulleripicus pulverulentus) of southeast Asia is the largest woodpecker certain to exist, with a weight of up to 500 g (1.1 lb) and a length of up to 0.58 m (1.9 ft).
- Less well-known than the woodpeckers and toucans, barbets can range up to 273 g (9.6 oz) and 33 cm (13 in) in the great barbet (Megalaima virens).
- The largest jacamar is the great jacamar (Jacamerops aureus). It measures 29.5 to 30 cm (11.61 to 11.81 in) in length and weighs between 63 and 70 g (2.22 and 2.47 oz).

==== Grebes (Podicipediformes) ====
- The largest species of grebe is the South American great grebe (Podiceps major). It can reach a length of 0.8 m (2.6 ft), with a wingspan of 1 m (3.3 ft) and a weight of over 2 kg (4.4 lb).

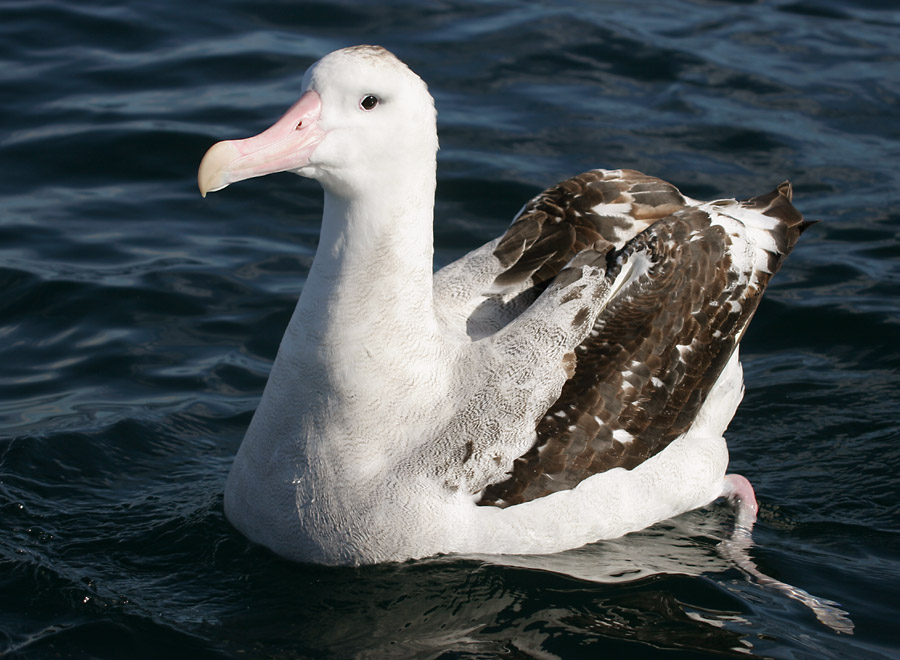
The wandering albatross is the largest seabird.

==== Tubenoses (Procellariiformes) ====
- The largest species of Procellariiformes is the wandering albatross (Diomedea exulans) of the sub-Antarctic oceans, which also has the largest wingspan of any living bird. The maximum dimensions of this species are a length of 1.44 m (4.7 ft) and a wingspan of 3.65 m (12.0 ft). Unverified specimens have been reported to measure 5.3 m (17 ft). Immature wandering albatrosses have weighed as much as 15.9 kg (35 lb) at the time of their first flights, with the maximum reported weight of adults being 12.7 kg (28 lb).
- The Southern royal albatross (Diomedea epomophora) is only slightly smaller in length, wingspan and weight, although it can sometimes be heavier than the former.
- The largest petrel is the southern giant petrel (Macronectes giganteus). It can reach a body length of 1 m (3.3 ft), with a wingspan of 2.1 m (6.9 ft) and a weight of 8 kg (18 lb).

==== Parrots (Psittaciformes) ====
- The largest parrot by length and wingspan is the endangered hyacinth macaw (Anodorhynchus hyacinthinus) of the neotropic lowlands, reaching a length of nearly 1.2 m (3.9 ft) with a wingspan of 1.4 m (4.6 ft) and weighing as little as 2 kg (4.4 lb). The heaviest parrot is the nearly extinct kākāpō (Strigops habroptilus), which is part of the New Zealand parrot family. The flightless kākāpō does not exceed 0.68 m (2.2 ft) in length, but weighs up to 4.1 kg (9.0 lb).
- The largest parakeet is the Alexandrine parakeet (Palaeornis eupatoria), reaching lengths of up to 60 centimetres and a mass of 250 grams.
- The largest species in the cockatoo family is the Australasian palm cockatoo (Probosciger aterrimus), at up to 0.6 m (2.0 ft) long with a weight of 1.2 kg (2.6 lb).

==== Sandgrouse (Pterocliformes) ====
- Black-bellied sandgrouse (Pterocles orientalis) is the largest sandgrouse, with a maximum size of 634 g (1.398 lb) and 45 cm (18 in).

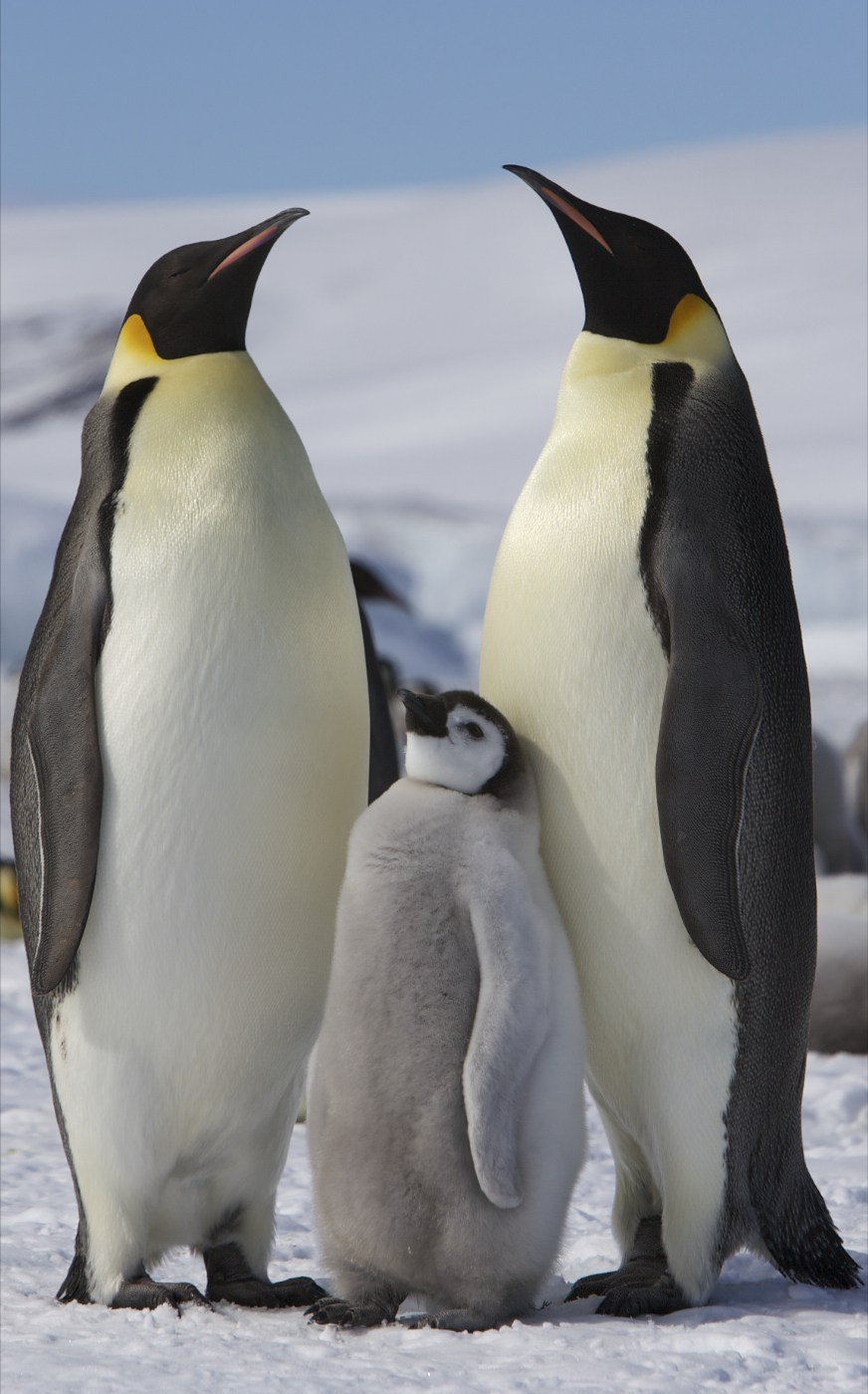
The emperor penguin is one of the heaviest living birds as well as the largest penguin.

==== Penguins (Sphenisciformes) ====
- The largest species of Sphenisciformes is the emperor penguin (Aptenodytes forsteri) of the Antarctic, with a maximum height of 1.35 m (4.4 ft) and a weight of 46 kg (101 lb). The next largest living species is the king penguin, which grows to a maximum of 1 m (3.3 ft) in height and 18 kg (40 lb) in weight. Now extinct, Anthropornis nordenskjoeldi, is believed to have reached a height of 1.8 m (5.9 ft) and a weight of up to 108 kg (238 lb).

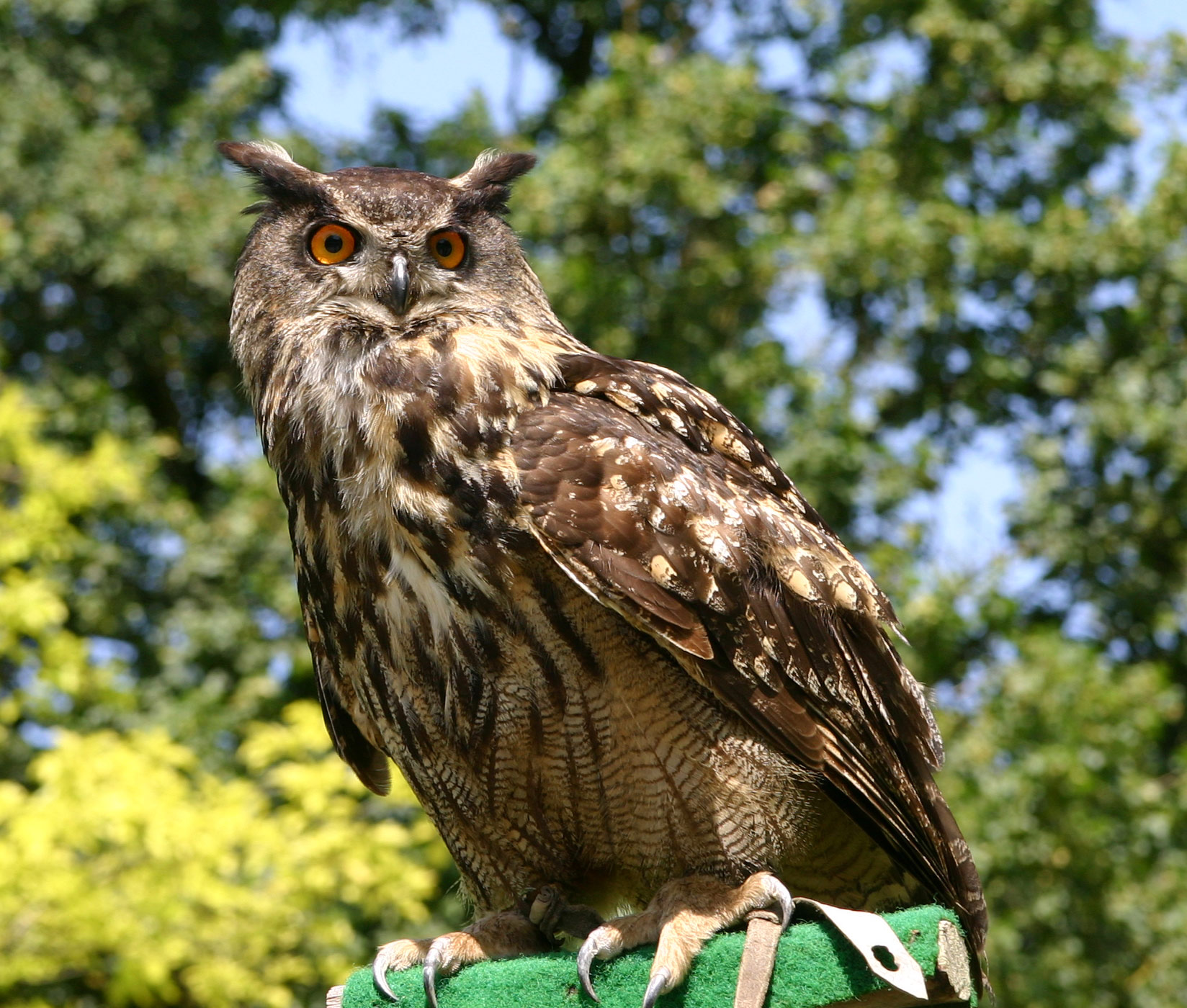
The Eurasian eagle-owl is one of the biggest owls.

==== Owls (Strigiformes) ====
- The most massive owl is certainly either the Eurasian eagle-owl (Bubo bubo) or the endangered and similarly sized Blakiston's fish owl (Bubo blakistoni) of coastal Russia and Japan. Record-sized specimens of both species have weighed approximately 4.5 kg (9.9 lb) and measured over 0.75 m (2.5 ft) long. In either species, the wingspan can range up to 2 m (6.6 ft). Longer still, but not as massive as the previous species (never more than 1.8 kg (4.0 lb) in weight), a large female great gray owl (Strix nebulosa) from the northern boreal forest can range up to 0.83 m (2.7 ft).
- The largest of the barn or masked owl family is the Tasmanian masked owl (Tyto novaehollandiae castanops), which weighs up to 1.4 kg (3.1 lb) and measures up to 0.6 m (2.0 ft). The largest owl known to have existed was Ornimegalonyx oteroi of Cuba, a cursorial owl. The giant bird was estimated to stand over 1.1 m (3.6 ft) on the ground and to weigh at least 9.05 kg (20.0 lb).

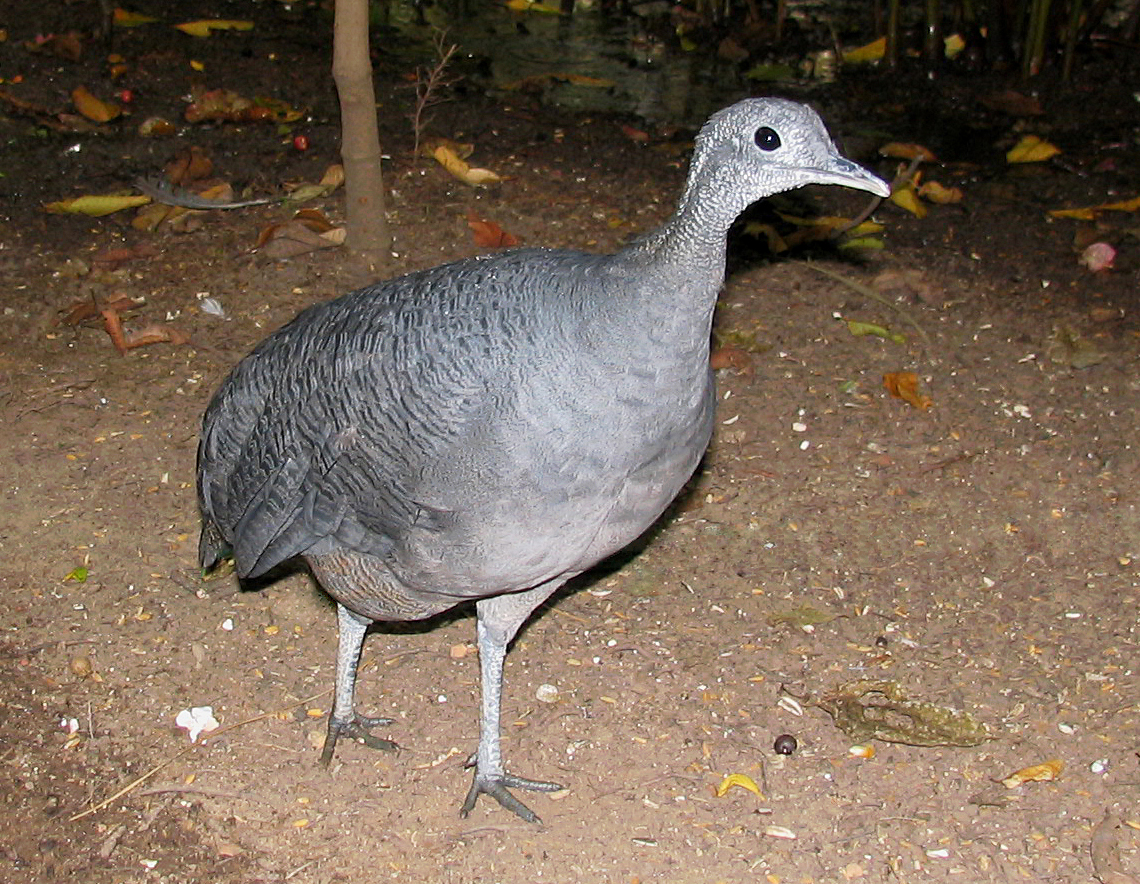
The grey tinamou ranks as the largest species of tinamou.

==== Ratites (Struthioniformes) ====
- The largest ratite is the ostrich (Struthio camelus), from the plains of Africa and Arabia. A large male ostrich can reach a height of 2.8 m (9.2 ft) and weigh over 156 kg (344 lb). A mass of 200 kg (440 lb) has been cited for the ostrich but no wild ostriches of this weight have been verified. Eggs laid by the ostrich are the largest in the world, weighing 1.4 kg (3.1 lb). The emu (Dromaius novaehollandiae) of Australia reaches 1 to 1.3 m (3.3–4.3 ft) at the shoulder with a full height of 150 to 190 cm (59–75 in). In length measured from the bill to the tail, emus range from 139 to 164 cm (55 to 65 in). The southern cassowary (Casuarius casuarius) from Australia and Papua New Guinea has a height of 127 to 190 cm (50 to 75 in). The greater rhea (Rhea americana) from South America weighs up to 20–27 kg (44–60 lb) and often measures 127 to 140 cm (50 to 55 in) long from beak to tail with a height of approximately 1.5 m (4.9 ft).
- The largest bird in the fossil record may be the extinct elephant bird (Aepyornis) of Madagascar, which were related to the ostrich. They exceeded 3 m (9.8 ft) in height and 500 kg (1,100 lb) in weight. The last of the elephant birds became extinct approximately 1000 years ago.
- The tallest bird ever was the South Island giant moa (Dinornis robustus), part of the moa family of New Zealand that went extinct about 500 years ago. The moa stood up to 3.7 m (12 ft) tall, and weighed approximately half as much as a large elephant bird or mihirung due to its comparatively slender frame.

==== Tinamous (Tinamiformes) ====
- The largest species of tinamou, a group of chunky, elusive ground-birds from neotropical forests, is the grey tinamou (Tinamus tao) of western South America. It can reach a weight over 2 kg (4.4 lb) and length of over 55 cm (22 in).

==== Trogons (Trogoniformes) ====
- The resplendent quetzal (Pharomachrus mocinno) of the montane forest of Central America is the largest trogon, though a few other quetzals approach similar sizes. It can weigh more than 226 g (8.0 oz) and, in females and non-breeding or immature males, they can measure up to 0.4 m (1.3 ft) from the head to the tail. Upon developing tail streamers, adult males can reach lengths of up to 0.6 m (2.0 ft).

== See also ==
- Dinosaur size
- Tallest extant birds
- Largest living flying birds by wingspan
