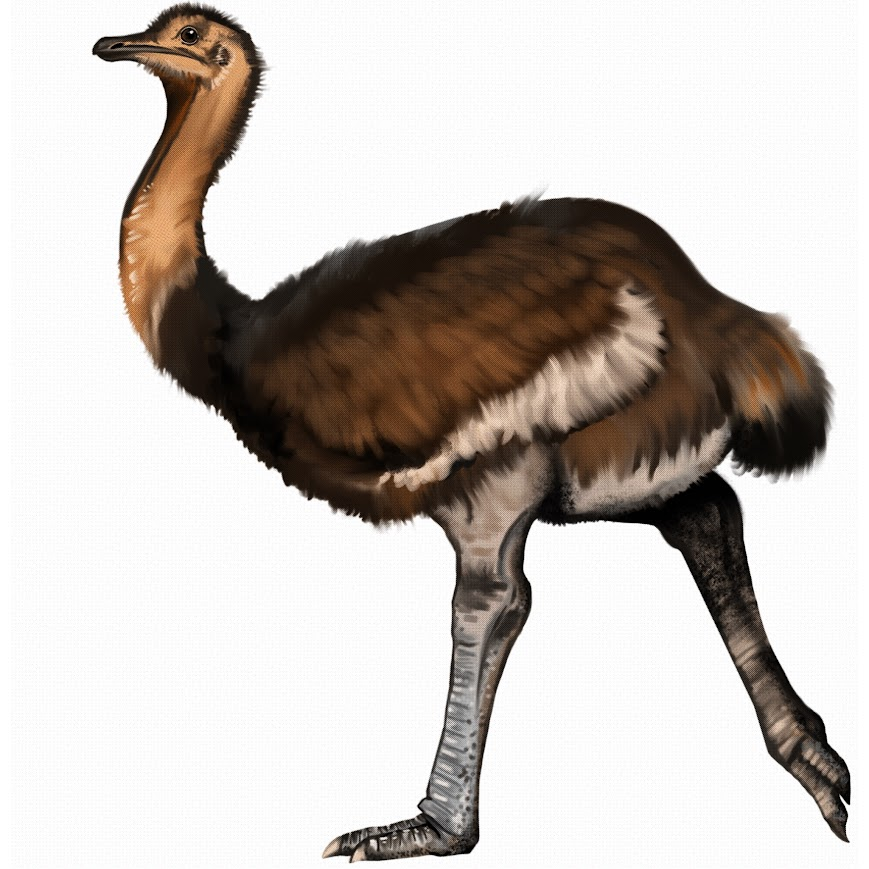
- Restoration of a male P. dmanisensis

Scientific classification
- Kingdom: Animalia
- Phylum: Chordata
- Class: Aves
- Infraclass: Palaeognathae
- Order: Struthioniformes
- Family: Struthionidae
- Genus: †Pachystruthio (Kretzoi, 1954)

Type species
- †Pachystruthio pannonicus (Kretzoi, 1954)

Other species
- †P. dmanisensis (Burchak-Abramovich & Vekua, 1990); †P. transcaucasicus (Burchak-Abramovich & Vekua, 1971)

Synonyms
- Struthio (Pachystruthio) Kretzoi, 1954a

= Pachystruthio =

Pachystruthio Temporal range: Pliocene–Middle Pleistocene

Extinct genus of large flightless birds

Pachystruthio (meaning "thick ostrich" in Greek) is an extinct genus of large flightless birds which lived in Eurasia from the Pliocene to the Middle Pleistocene. Its fossils have been found in Hungary, Greece, Crimea, Georgia, and China. Pachystruthio was related to living ostriches, being another group of Struthioniformes, but separate from the extant ostrich genus Struthio. One of the species, P. dmanisensis, has been estimated as standing 3.5 metres (11 ft) tall and weighing around 450 kg (990 lb), making it much larger than the modern ostrich and one of the largest known birds.

== Taxonomy ==
The genus contains three species: P. pannonicus (the type species), P. dmanisensis, and P. transcaucasicus, which were all formerly placed with the ostrich genus, Struthio. Pachystruthio itself was formerly a subgenus of Struthio.

Zelenkov et al. state that P. dmanisensis and P. pannonicus may represent one species. Vekua suggested that seeking relations between P. dmanisensis and P. transcaucasicus is more natural, due to shared locality, geologic age, and large size (while still noting P. transcaucasicus is a well-expressed independent species).

Éric Buffetaut proposed placing the large (albeit smaller than P. dmanisensis) extinct ostrich species Struthio anderssoni from the Late Pleistocene of China in the genus. Zelenkov et al. suggested that Struthio karatheodoris may also belong to this genus.

Although P. dmanisensis is known as the giant ostrich, its relationship to the extant ostriches of the genus Struthio is not clear.

== Description ==
=== General characteristics ===
Pachystruthio were huge, flightless birds, having more massive bones and eggs than living ostriches. Notably, known specimens of the femur are very robust, differentiating them from other fossil ostriches, which have a lower "stoutness index" (ratio between total length and minimum shaft width of the femur). Due to lack of available material, it is difficult to reconstruct the general proportions.

=== P. dmanisensis ===
The femur of various specimens from P. dmanisensis measure from 380–405 mm (15.0–15.9 in) in length and a have minimum shaft circumference of 220–240 mm (8.7–9.4 in). These femora are considerably more massive than those of any fossil or recent Struthio ostrich. The minimum shaft circumference can be used to calculate body weight, yielding values of 382–472 kg (842–1,041 lb) depending on the specimen. A similar calculation, using the middle shaft circumference (which was the same as the minimum in the specimen used) gave 462 kg (1,019 lb), within the previous range. Most fossil species of ostriches from the genus struthio differ from P. dmanisensis in noticeably smaller dimensions. Height for this species has been estimated at 3.5 metres (11 ft). P. dmanisensis has been described as the largest known bird of the northern hemisphere, although P. transcaucasicus may have been larger.

=== Pachystruthio indet. ===
An incomplete femur from the Nihewan Formation (China) early Pleistocene in age has been assigned to Pachystruthio indet. and has smaller measurements than P. dmanisensis, with a length of about 340 mm (13 in) and minimum shaft circumference of 199 mm (7.8 in), which gives it a weight estimate of 300 kg (660 lb). Despite its relatively smaller size, this femur is still larger than those of modern ostriches and extinct species Struthio anderssoni, which based on the femur was 269 kg (593 lb).

=== P. pannonicus ===
This species was described based on a "remarkably large and morphologically distinct" pedal phalanx. In 1955, Kretzoi considered it "larger than all known ostrich species", and estimated egg size of P. pannonicus to be 22 cm (8.7 in) in length and 18 cm (7.1 in) in width. A 2025 article estimated the mass of the eggs to be 4.25 kg (9.4 lb) based on these dimensions. Sauer has estimated the size of the egg to be twice the volume of recent Struthio camelus, and comparable to ootaxa Namornis oshanai (although P. pannonicus eggshells may not be as thick). Along with their larger dimensions, eggshells associated with P. pannonicus are much thicker than those of modern ostriches (2.6 – 3.4 mm). Zelenkov et al. state that P. dmanisensis and P. pannonicus are "similarly sized taxa", although based on different skeletal elements making direct comparison impossible. Vekua also expressed this idea, stating that P. pannonicus was a rather huge ostrich and probably not inferior to P. dmanisensis in dimensions

=== P. transcaucasicus ===
P. transcaucasicus was described based on a pelvis from the late Pliocene. This species has also been associated with thick eggshell fragments (2.9–3.3 mm) Mikhailov and Zelenkov note eggshells known from the late Miocene to early Pleistocene in the eastern part of Kazakhstan, being 2.5–3.0 mm or even up to 3.5 mm in thickness may also belong to P. transcaucasicus primarily due to its age, thickness, and geographical occurrence. They considered this the most eastern known range of Pachystruthio (before the description of the Nihewan femur). P. transcaucasicus has been described as larger than fossil species Struthio wimani and Struthio karatheodoris based on its larger pelvis, as well as Struthio brachydactylus and Struthio camelus (the extant common ostrich). According to Vekua, P. transcaucasicus was somewhat larger than P. dmanisensis; judging this based on the diameter of the acetabular depression of P. transcaucasicus, and the greatest diameter of a caput femori of P. dmanisensis.

== Geologic age ==
While Pachystruthio is well established as a late Pliocene – early Pleistocene taxa, it may have earlier origins, with some authors suggesting that "the evolutionary lineage of these giant early Pleistocene birds can probably be traced back to the early Pliocene and even Miocene of Anatolia."

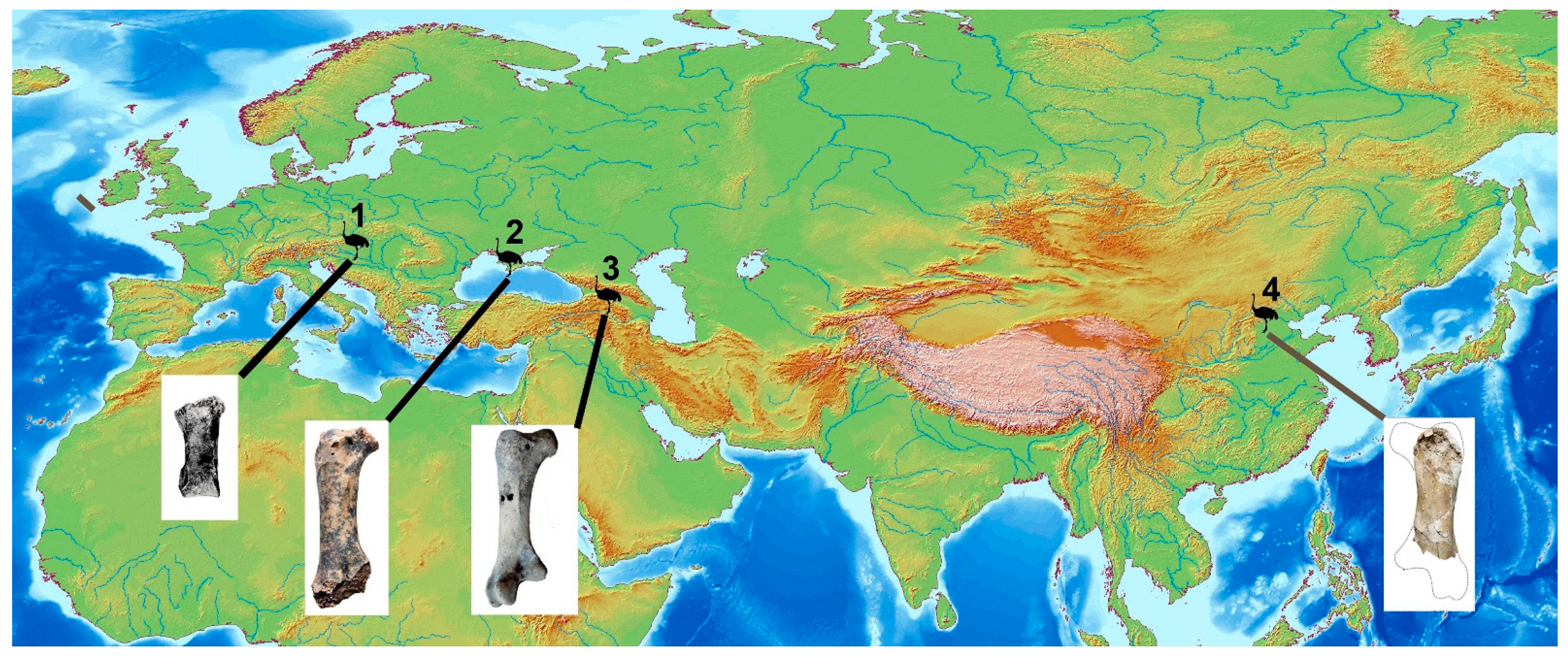
Skeletal remains referrable to Pachystruthio in the Lower Pleistocene of Eurasia

== Paleobiology ==
=== Size ===
Some authors have proposed that larger body weight may have been an adaptation for tougher, low-nutrition food of arid environments, noting increased body weight in Dromornithidae has been related to increased aridity of Australia. This connection is also present in Eogruidae and has been proposed for Struthio anderssoni, whose large body weight may be explained by an increase in aridity in Inner Asia during cold climatic phases. This hypothesis is contested, as Buffetaut and Angst note that in China where Pachystruthio lived was not especially arid. Additionally, Struthio anderssoni, although large, was smaller than Pachystruthio despite that it apparently lived under a more arid climate, and living ostriches that are also smaller lived and used to live in arid environments.

=== Locomotion ===
The robust femur of P. dmanisensis, compared to those more slender of other Pleistocene ostriches such as Struthio oldawayi, may indicate it was less adapted for fast running. Similarly, Zelenkov et al. proposed Pachystruthio may not be as good a runner as modern ostriches due to its weight. These characteristics probably apply to the Nihewan ostrich (P. indet.) as well. However, it has also been suggested that P. dmanisensis was a better runner than the giant species of Aepyornithidae which possessed an even more robust femur.

=== Interactions with humans and predation ===
Buffetaut and Angst note that whether early hominins of the Nihewan Basin hunted Pachystruthio is uncertain, but "a bird twice the weight of the living ostrich could not have been easy prey, although egg collecting may have been less hazardous". Other authors note that these large birds might have been a source of meat, bones, feathers, and eggshell for early hominin populations.

Zelenkov et al. state that in contrast to other giant birds, Pachystruthio lived with a variety of highly specialized large carnivorous mammals, such as the giant cheetah (Acinonyx pardinensis), giant hyenas (Pachycrocuta brevirostris), and saber-toothed cats (Homotherium spp., Megantereon spp.). Being less adapted for running than recent ostriches, Pachystruthio may have been more susceptible to attacks from large carnivorans, though due to their large size, adult individuals of Pachystruthio were less vulnerable than young individuals and smaller Struthio ostriches.

== Extinction ==
According to Widrig and Field, one theory on the extinction of Eurasian ostriches is that their decline was at least partly linked to climatic cooling during the Cenozoic. However, fossil eggshells indicating the possible presence of ostriches in Mongolia well into the Holocene would seem to contradict this explanation, and a stronger explanation for their disappearance is needed. Vekua noted that the extinction of ostriches in the South Caucasus was in the early Quaternary, which was "connected with sharp worsening of the climatic conditions." Overhunting is a possibility.

== See also ==
- Struthio orlovi, flightless bird fossils in Central and Eastern Europe
