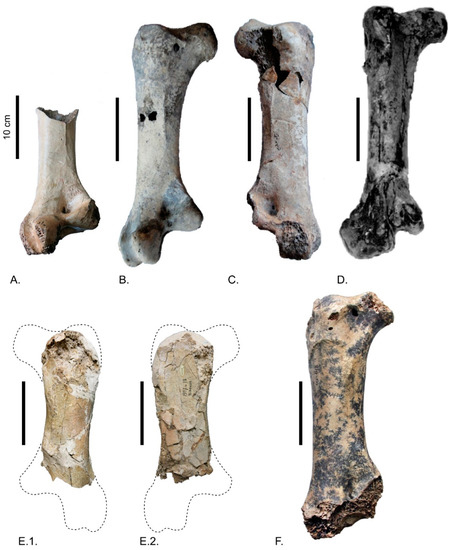
- Comparison between femora of Struthio oldawayi (D) and other extinct ostriches

Scientific classification
- Kingdom: Animalia
- Phylum: Chordata
- Class: Aves
- Infraclass: Palaeognathae
- Order: Struthioniformes
- Family: Struthionidae
- Genus: Struthio
- Species: †S. oldawayi

Binomial name
- †Struthio oldawayi Lowe, 1933

= Struthio oldawayi =

Struthio oldawayi Temporal range: Pleistocene

Extinct ostrich species

Struthio oldawayi is an extinct species of ostrich from the early Pleistocene in Tanzania and possibly Kenya. Zelenkov et al notes it differs little in morphology from modern ostriches but notably is much larger in size.

== Taxonomy ==
Harrison and Msuya (2005) treated this species as a synonym of S. camelus.

== Description ==
Bones of a large ostrich found in the Pleistocene of Kenya may refer to this species. Mass has been roughly estimated at 275 kg, making Struthio oldawayi is one of the largest species of its genus, however those of Pachystruthio were significantly heavier.

=== Femur ===
A femur of the species was found in Olduvai Gorge which had a length of 400 mm and a minimum shaft width of 64 mm, significantly larger than those of extant ostriches, as well as the larger fossil ostrich Struthio Anderssoni and multiple specimens of Pachystruthio dmanisensis, despite being less robust. This bone is of similar morphology to the extant ostrich despite its larger size. Its femur morphology indicates it may have been fast and agile.

=== Possible eggs ===
Mikhailov and Zelenkov suggested eggshells from the oospecies Psammornis rothschildi belong to this taxa. Egg fragments measure 3.2–3.3 mm in thickness, although the original thickness may have been near 4 mm. The egg size has been estimated at 25–28 cm (9.8–11.0 in) in length and 19–21 cm (7.5–8.3 in) in width, with a mass of 7 kg (15 lb), making it far larger than modern ostrich eggs and still larger than those of the large ostrich relative Pachystruthio pannonicus.
