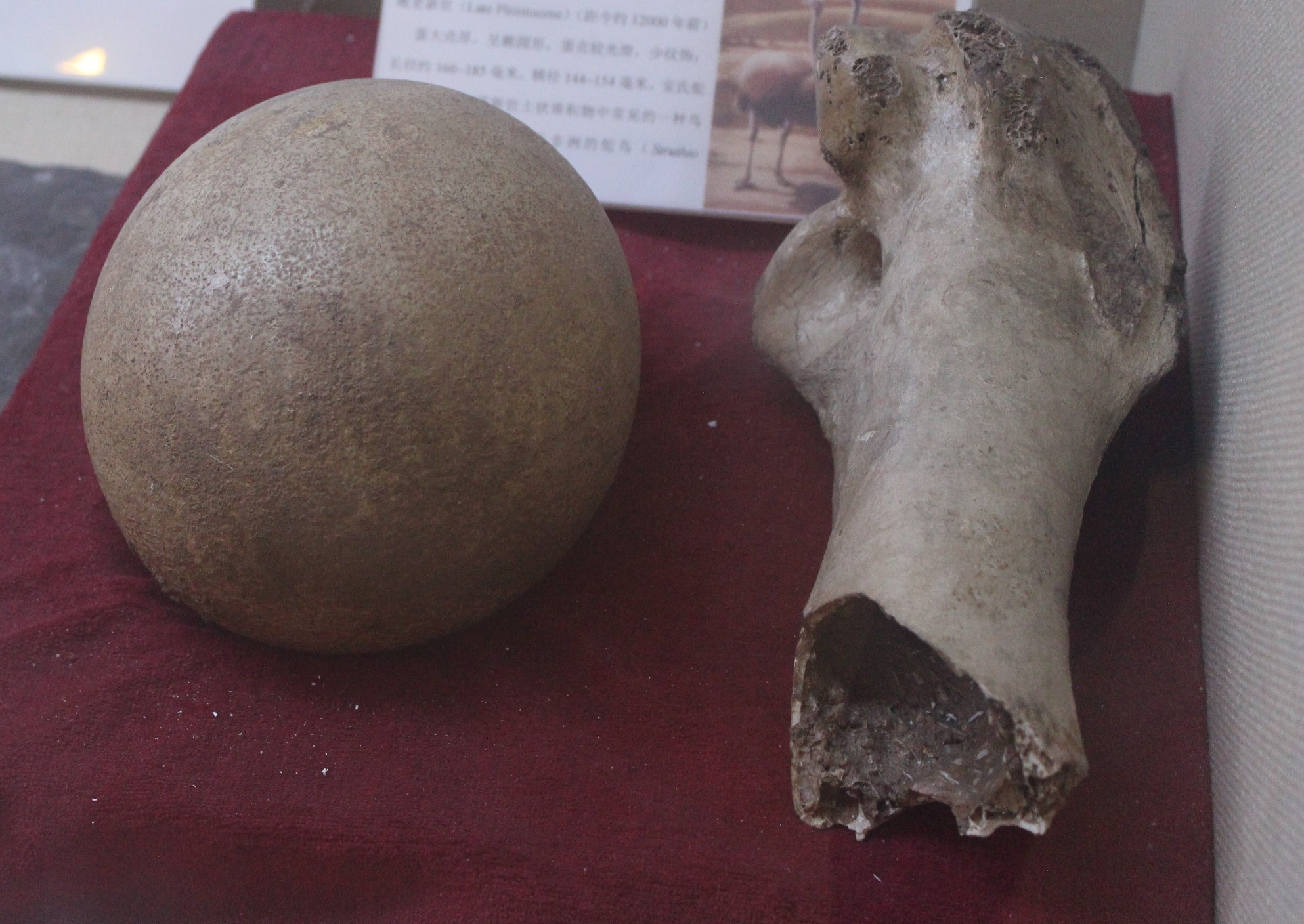
- Egg and limb of S. anderssoni, Paleozoological Museum of China

Scientific classification
- Kingdom: Animalia
- Phylum: Chordata
- Class: Aves
- Infraclass: Palaeognathae
- Order: Struthioniformes
- Family: Struthionidae
- Genus: Struthio
- Species: S. anderssoni

Binomial name
- Struthio anderssoni Percy Lowe, 1931

= Struthio anderssoni =

East Asian ostrich Temporal range: Pleistocene–Holocene

Extinct species of ostrich

Struthio anderssoni, also known as the East Asian ostrich, is a large extinct species of ostrich that lived in the Pleistocene and Holocene in China, Mongolia and Russia. It was much larger than extant ostriches, with estimated mass of 250–270 kg (550–600 lb).

== Taxonomy ==
In 2023, based on a re-examination of cast of a femur, Éric Buffetaut suggested that this species be moved to the genus Pachystruthio, noting that the main differences are in size and not morphology between the femur of Pachystruthio and that of S. anderssoni.

Mikhailov and Zelenkov suggested this species is a larger bodied form of extant ostriches. Buffetaut disagreed with this hypothesis, noting the significantly larger size and differing morphological features, including the minimum shaft width/total length ratio of the femur.

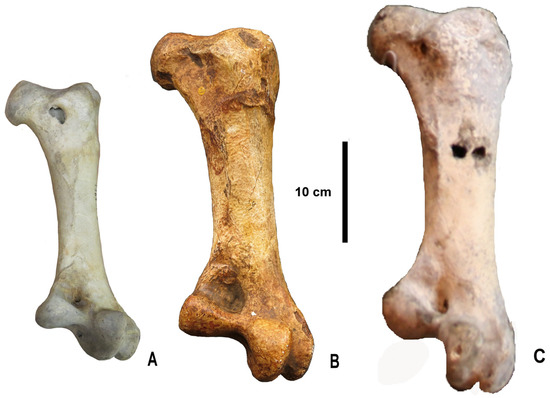
Comparison of femora of Struthio camelus (A), S/P. anderssoni (B), and Pachystruthio dmanisensis (C)

== Description ==
Buffetaut and Angst conclude that Struthio anderssoni was significantly larger than the modern ostrich, with both eggs and skeletal remains indicating this.

=== Femur ===
The femur of one specimen from Upper Cave at Zhoukoudian measures 355 mm in length (within the estimated range of 304 – 371 mm for the species) and 69 mm in minimum shaft width. A 187 mm minimum shaft circumference on a cast from this species gives a mass estimate of 258 kg (569 lb). Another partial femur has a minimum shaft circumference of 190 mm, which gives it a mass estimate of 269 kg (593 lb).

=== Eggs ===
In 1933, three nearly complete eggs were measured to be 17.5–19.3 cm (6.9–7.6 in) in length and 14.4–15.5 cm (5.7–6.1 in) in width. Slightly differing size ranges from Lowe (1931) were calculated in a 2025 article to correspond to 1.89–2.8 kg (4.2–6.2 lb) in mass. Buffetaut and Angst had earlier calculated a marginally smaller egg mass, being 1.7–2.6 kg (3.7–5.7 lb). Despite their larger size, the eggs are not significantly thicker than those of modern ostriches, being 2.1–2.3 mm in shell thickness. A mass estimate based on the eggs results in 176–350 kg (388–772 lb), with a mean of 263 kg (580 lb).

== Paleobiology and extinction ==
The large body and egg size of S. anderssoni may be an adaptation for a cold climate, in which this species was more cold tolerant than African ostriches (although this is not the sole explanation, due to the existence of large ostriches in warmer climates), but both being well suited for arid environments. They may have had similar internal physiology to African ostriches, due to similarity in egg morphology.

The youngest dates obtained by mass spectrometry analysis of eggshell fragments reveal that the species survived until at least 8.9 ka BP.

== See also ==
- Struthio oldawayi
- Struthio wimani
