= Struthio wimani =

Struthio wimani Temporal range: Late Miocene–Early Pliocene

Scientific classification
- Kingdom: Animalia
- Phylum: Chordata
- Class: Aves
- Infraclass: Palaeognathae
- Order: Struthioniformes
- Family: Struthionidae
- Genus: Struthio
- Species: S. wimani

Binomial name
- Struthio wimani Lowe, P, 1931

Extinct species of bird

Struthio wimani is an extinct species of ostrich from the Miocene and Pliocene of China. Struthio wimani has been suggested as a senior synonym of Orientornis linxiaensis.

It has been described as larger than the living Struthio camelus (common ostrich), having larger measurements.

S. wimani laid eggs larger than those of extant ostriches, similar in size to those of Struthio anderssoni, measuring 18.6 / 15.3 cm in length and width, and an estimated mass of 2.58 kg.
