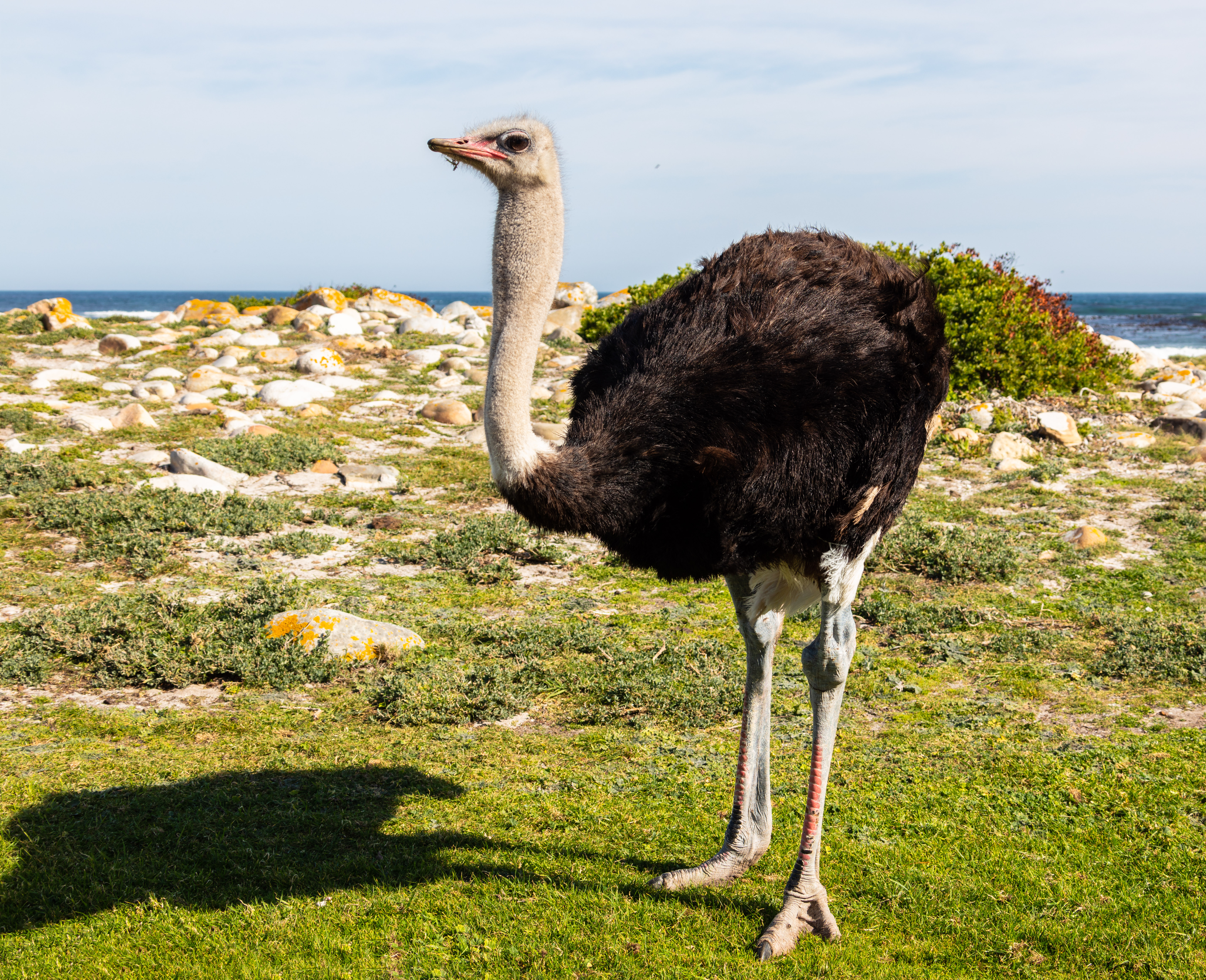
- Struthio camelus australis at the Cape of Good Hope, South Africa

Scientific classification
- Kingdom: Animalia
- Phylum: Chordata
- Class: Aves
- Infraclass: Palaeognathae
- Order: Struthioniformes
- Family: Struthionidae; Vigors, 1825

Type genus
- Struthio Linnaeus, 1758

Other genera
- †Orientornis Wang, 2008; †Pachystruthio (Kretzoi, 1954)

Synonyms
- †Struthiolithidae Vjalov, 1971

= Struthionidae =

Struthionidae Temporal range: Miocene-Holocene, 21–0 Ma

Family of birds

Struthionidae (/ˌstruːθiˈɒnədiː/; from Latin strūthiō 'ostrich' and Ancient Greek εἶδος (eîdos) 'appearance, resemblance') is a family of flightless birds, containing the extant ostriches and their extinct relatives. The two extant species of ostrich are the common ostrich and Somali ostrich, both in the genus Struthio, which also contains several species known from Holocene fossils such as the Asian ostrich. The common ostrich is the more widespread of the two living species, and is the largest living bird species. Species of the extinct genus Pachystruthio from the Late Pliocene-Early Pleistocene of Eurasia are some of the largest birds ever.

The first species of Struthio appear during the Miocene epoch, though various Paleocene, Eocene, and Oligocene fossils may also belong to the family. Ostriches are classified in the ratite group of birds, all extant species of which are flightless, including the kiwis, emus, and rheas. Traditionally, the order Struthioniformes contained all the ratites. However, recent genetic analysis has found that the group is not monophyletic, as it is paraphyletic with respect to the tinamous, so the ostriches are usually classified as the only members of the order, though the IUCN uses a broader classification and includes all "ratites" and tinamous in Struthioniformes.

== Evolution ==
Struthionidae is a member of the Struthioniformes, a group of paleognath birds which first appeared during the Early Eocene, and includes a variety of flightless forms which were present across the Northern Hemisphere (Europe, Asia and North America) during the Eocene epoch. The closest relatives of Struthionidae within the Struthioniformes are the Ergilornithidae, known from the late Eocene to early Pliocene of Asia. It is therefore most likely that Struthionidae originated in Asia. The oldest records of Struthionidae, belonging to the genus Struthio, are from the Early Miocene of Africa, around 21 million years old. Struthio dispersed into and became widespread in Eurasia during the late middle-Late Miocene epoch beginning around 12 million years ago. Pachystruthio from the Late Pliocene of Eurasia contains some of the largest bird species ever with some species likely weighing up to 450 kilograms (990 lb).

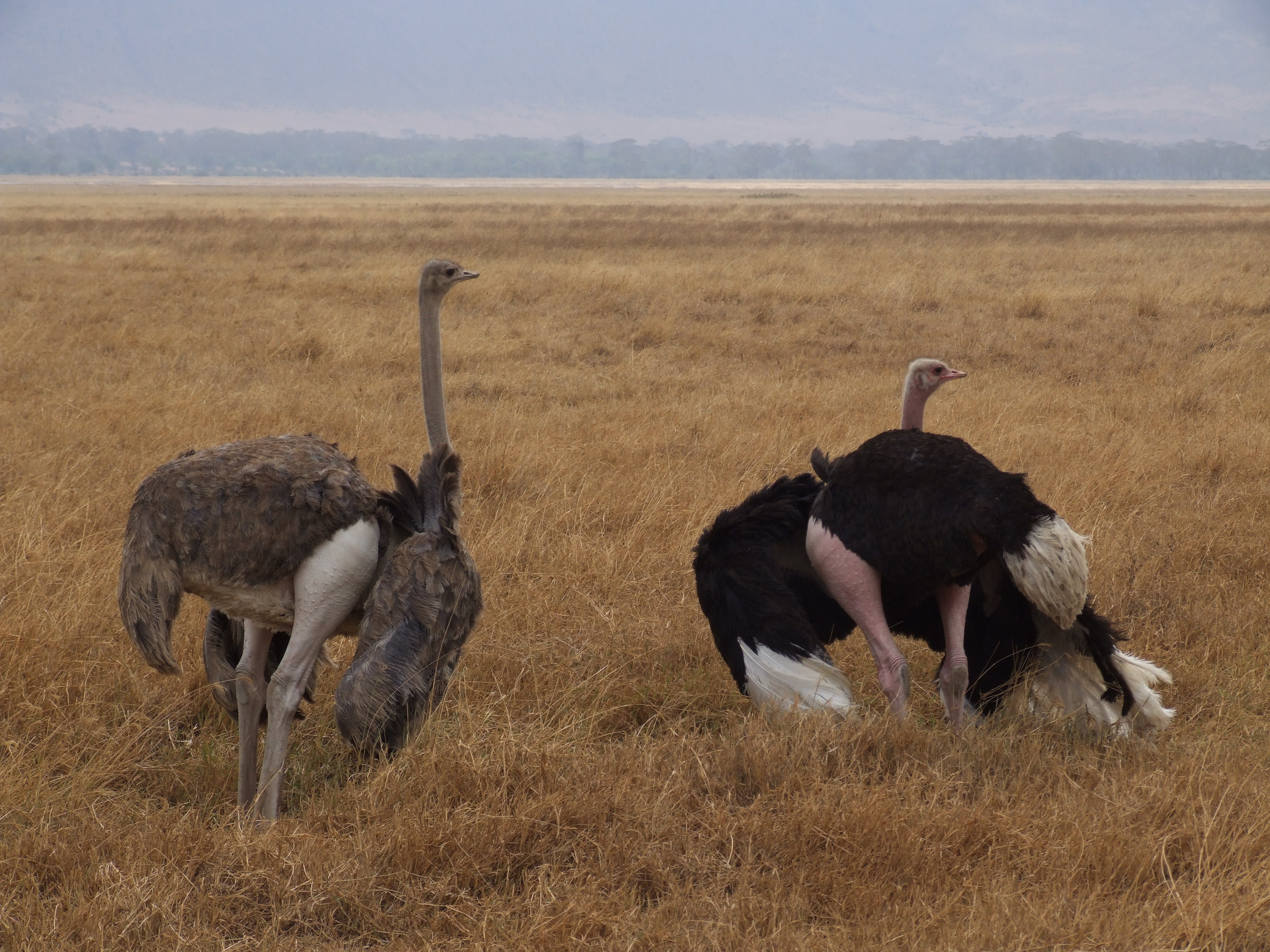
Struthio camelus massaicus, female (left) and male (right)

While the relationship of the African fossil species is comparatively straightforward, many Asian species of ostriches have been described from fragmentary remains, and their interrelationships and how they relate to the African ostriches are confusing. In China, ostriches are known to have become extinct only around or even after the end of the last ice age; images of ostriches have been found there on prehistoric pottery and petroglyphs.

== Distribution and habitat ==
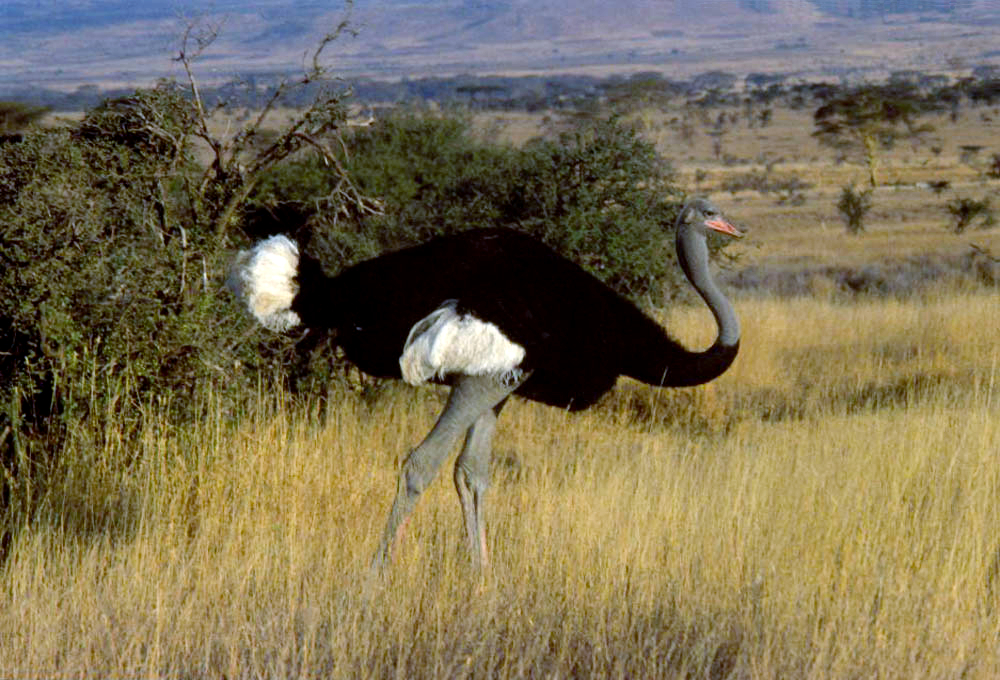
A male Somali ostrich in a Kenyan savanna, showing its blueish neck

Today ostriches are only found natively in the wild in Africa, where they occur in a range of open arid and semi-arid habitats such as savannas and the Sahel, both north and south of the equatorial forest zone. The Somali ostrich occurs in the Horn of Africa, having evolved isolated from the common ostrich by the geographic barrier of the East African Rift. In some areas, the common ostrich's Masai subspecies occurs alongside the Somali ostrich, but they are kept from interbreeding by behavioral and ecological differences. The Arabian ostriches in Asia Minor and Arabia were hunted to extinction by the middle of the 20th century, and in Israel attempts to introduce North African ostriches to fill their ecological role have failed. Escaped common ostriches in Australia have established feral populations.

== Taxonomy ==
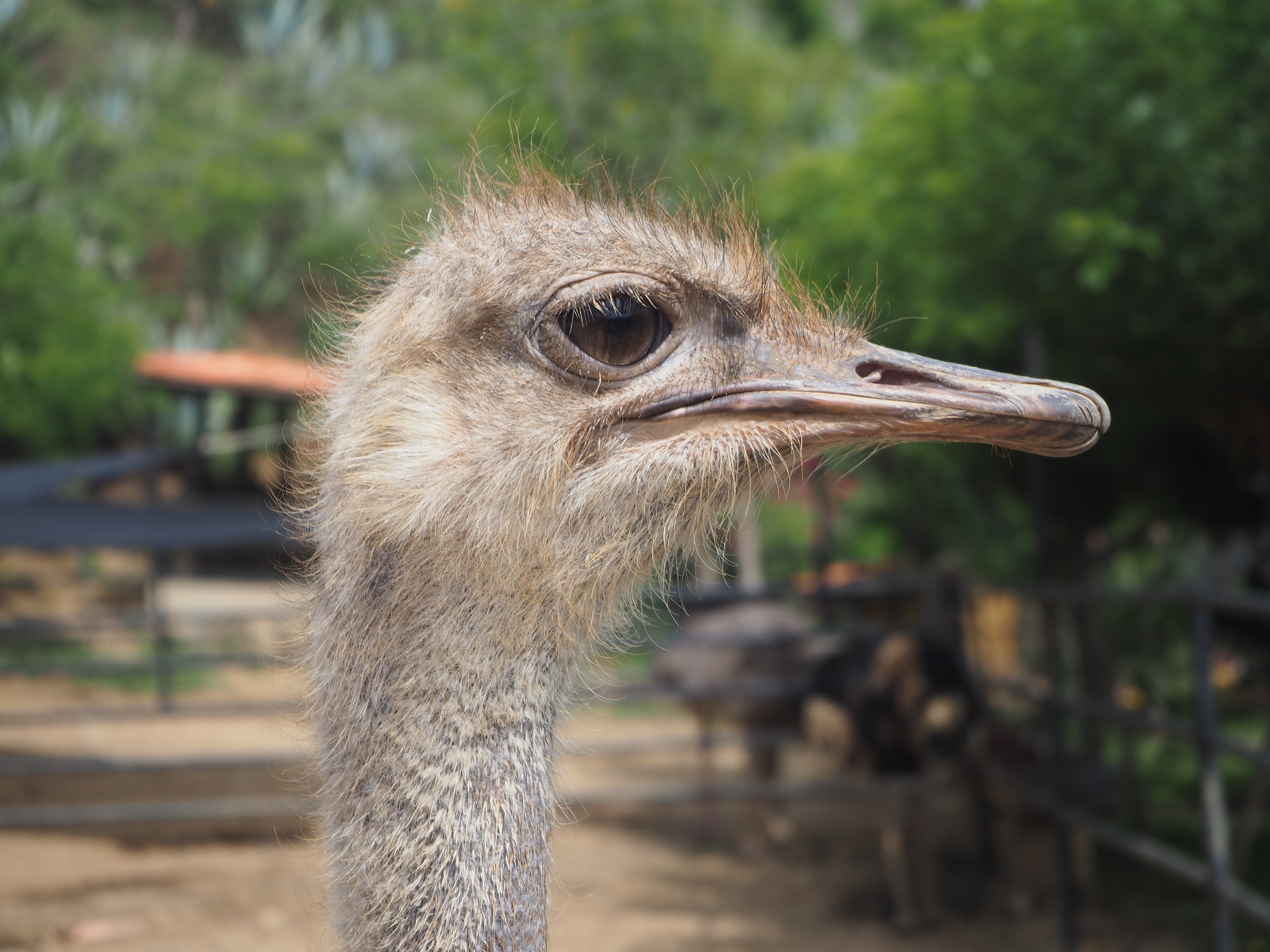
Ostrich in Bucaramanga, Colombia

In 2019, the species S. pannonicus, S. dmanisensis (the giant ostrich), and S. transcaucasicus were transferred to the genus Pachystruthio.

Order Struthioniformes Latham 1790 (ostriches)

- Family Struthionidae Vigors 1825
  - Genus †Orientornis Wang 2008 (Late Miocene)
  - Genus †Pachystruthio (Kretzoi 1954) (Late Pliocene – Pleistocene)
  - Genus Struthio Linnaeus 1758 (Early Miocene – Recent)

== See also ==
- Ostrich egg
