= Surrender =

Surrender may refer to:

- Surrender (law), the early relinquishment of a tenancy
- Surrender (military), the relinquishment of territory, combatants, facilities, or armaments to another power

== Film and television ==
- Surrender (1927 film), an American romance directed by Edward Sloman
- Surrender (1931 film), an American drama directed by William K. Howard
- Surrender (1950 film), an American Western directed by Allan Dwan
- Surrender (1987 American film), an American comedy directed by Jerry Belson
- Surrender (1987 Bangladeshi film), a film directed by Zahirul Haque
- Surrender (2025 film), an Indian Tamil-language film directed by Gowthaman Ganapathy
- The Surrender, a 2025 horror film
- "Surrender" (Charmed 2018 TV series), a television episode
- "Surrender" (Outlander), a television episode
- "Surrender" (Third Watch), a television episode
- "Surrender" (Star Trek: Picard), a television episode

== Music ==
=== Albums ===
- Surrender (Bizzle album) or the title song, 2015
- Surrender (The Chemical Brothers album) or the title song, 1999
- Surrender (Debby Boone album) or the title song, 1983
- Surrender (Diana Ross album) or the title song (see below), 1971
- Surrender (Hurts album) or the title song, 2015
- Surrender (Javine album), 2004
- Surrender (Jeff Deyo album), 2005
- Surrender (Kut Klose album) or the title song, 1995
- Surrender (Kutless album), 2015
- Surrender (Maggie Rogers album), 2022
- Surrender (O'Bryan album) or the title song, 1986
- Surrender (Rüfüs Du Sol album) or the title song, 2021
- Surrender (Sarah Brightman and Andrew Lloyd Webber album) or the title song, from Sunset Boulevard, 1995
- Surrender (EP), by Paint It Black, or the title song, 2009
- Surrender, by Camille Jones, 2004
- Surrender, by Hans Christian, 1996
- Surrender, by Jane Monheit, 2007

=== Songs ===
- "Surrender" (Billy Talent song), 2007
- "Surrender" (Cash Cash song), 2014
- "Surrender" (Cheap Trick song), 1978
- "Surrender" (The Collective song), 2012
- "Surrender" (Diana Ross song), 1971
- "Surrender" (Elvis Presley song), 1961
- "Surrender" (Laura Pausini song), 2002
- "Surrender" (Paul Haig song), 1993
- "Surrender" (Perry Como song), 1946
- "Surrender" (Suicide song), 1988
- "Surrender" (Swing Out Sister song), 1987
- "Surrender" (Tom Petty song), 2000
- "Surrender (Your Love)", by Javine, 2003
- "Surrender", by Alesso and Becky Hill, 2025
- "Surrender", by All Saints from Saints & Sinners, 2000
- "Surrender", by Angels & Airwaves from Love: Part Two, 2011
- "Surrender", by As Blood Runs Black from Ground Zero, 2014
- "Surrender", by Ashlee Simpson from Autobiography, 2004
- "Surrender", by Ball Park Music, 2012
- "Surrender", by Birdy from Young Heart, 2021
- "Surrender", by Chancellor and Lyn, 2016
- "Surrender", by DD Smash from The Optimist, 1984
- "Surrender", by Debbie Harry from KooKoo, 1981
- "Surrender", by Depeche Mode, a B-side of the single "Only When I Lose Myself", 1998
- "Surrender", by Donna De Lory from In the Glow, 2003
- "Surrender", by Dropkick Murphys from The Meanest of Times, 2007
- "Surrender", by Electric Light Orchestra from A New World Record, 2006 reissue
- "Surrender", by Evanescence, 2001/2002
- "Surrender", by George Canyon from Better Be Home Soon, 2011
- "Surrender", by Imminence from Heaven in Hiding, 2021
- "Surrender", by In This Moment from Beautiful Tragedy, 2007
- "Surrender", by the J. Geils Band from Monkey Island, 1977
- "Surrender", by Jeremy Camp from Speaking Louder Than Before, 2008
- "Surrender", by Jhené Aiko from Chilombo, 2020
- "Surrender", by Joy Williams from By Surprise, 2002
- "Surrender", by Kasey Chambers from Carnival, 2006
- "Surrender", by k.d. lang from the Tomorrow Never Dies soundtrack, 1997
- "Surrender", by Kylie Minogue from Kylie Minogue, 1994
- "Surrender", by Lasgo from Far Away, 2005
- "Surrender", by Matt Brouwer from Unlearning, 2005
- "Surrender", by Mikuni Shimokawa, 2000
- "Surrender", by Mr. Mister from Pull, 2010
- "Surrender", by Natalie Taylor, 2015
- "Surrender", by Nine Lashes from From Water to War, 2014
- "Surrender", by Ólöf Arnalds with Björk from Innundir skinni, 2010
- "Surrender", by Paloma Faith from The Architect, 2017
- "Surrender", by Robbie Williams from Under the Radar Volume 1, 2014
- "Surrender", by Roger Taylor from Electric Fire, 1998
- "Surrender", by Roxette from Pearls of Passion, 1986
- "Surrender", by Sammy Hagar from Standing Hampton, 1982
- "Surrender", by Savatage from Poets and Madmen, 2001
- "Surrender", by The Smith Street Band from Throw Me in the River, 2014
- "Surrender", by Trixter from Trixter, 1990
- "Surrender", by U2 from War, 1983
- "Surrender", by Walk the Moon from What If Nothing, 2017
- "Surrender", by Your Memorial from Atonement, 2010
- "Surrender", from the musical Sunset Boulevard, 1993

== Other uses ==
- Surrender (novel), a 2005 psychological thriller by Sonya Hartnett
- Surrender (religion), the relinquishment of one's own will to a spiritual power
- SurRender, now dPVS, a computer graphics tool produced by Umbra
- Surrender, the process of terminating an insurance policy in return for surrender value
- Surrender, a former nightclub on the Las Vegas Strip now known as Encore Beach Club at Night
- Surrender: 40 Songs, One Story, a 2022 memoir by Bono

== See also ==
- "Surrendered", a song by Chris Quilala from Split the Sky, 2016
- "Surrendering" (song), by Alanis Morissette, 2002
- "Surrendering", a song by Candlebox from Into the Sun, 2008
- Surender (disambiguation), an Indian name
- Surinder, an Indian name
- Submission (disambiguation)
