= You're Dead to Me =

You're Dead to Me may refer to:

- "You're Dead to Me", a song from the album Up on the Ridge by American country music artist Dierks Bentley, released in 2010
- "You're Dead to Me" (Charmed 2018 TV series), an episode of the Charmed TV series, released in 2018
- You're Dead to Me, a BBC Sounds podcast about a historical figure or time period, presented by Greg Jenner since 2019
