= I Surrender =

I Surrender may refer to:

== Songs ==
- "I Surrender" (Celine Dion song), 2002
- "I Surrender" (Clea song), 2006
- "I Surrender (To the Spirit of the Night)", a 1987 song by Samantha Fox
- "I Surrender" (David Sylvian song), 1999
- "I Surrender" (Michelle Wright song), 2000
- "I Surrender" (Rainbow song)", 1981
- "I Surrender", by A Day to Remember from the album Common Courtesy
- "I Surrender", a 2016 song by All Sons & Daughters from the album Poets & Saints
- "I Surrender", by Michael Bolton from the album Only a Woman Like You
- "I Surrender", by Darrell Evans from the album You Are I AM
- "I Surrender", a 2012 song by Hillsong Live from the album Cornerstone
- "I Surrender", a 2004 song by Saybia from the album These Are the Days
- "Ich hab mich ergeben", former national anthem of West Germany

== See also ==
- Surrender (disambiguation)
- I Surrender Dear (disambiguation)
