= Dominance and submission (disambiguation) =

Dominance and submission is a subset of BDSM.

Dominance and submission may also refer to:

- Dominance hierarchy, dominance and submission in human or primate behavior
- "Dominance and Submission", a 1974 song by Blue Öyster Cult from Secret Treaties

== See also ==
- Dominance (disambiguation)
- Domination (disambiguation)
- Submission (disambiguation)
