= Dizmas =

American Christian rock band

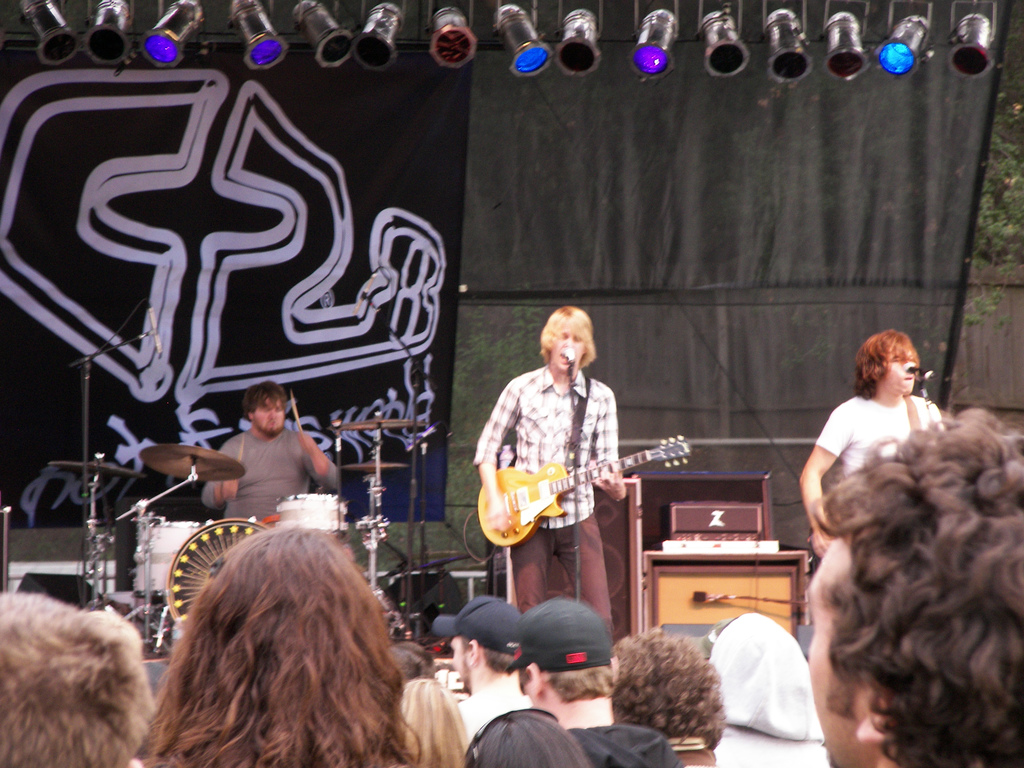
- Rock band Dizmas live in 2007

Background information
- Origin: Lancaster, California, United States
- Genres: Christian rock, post-hardcore, alternative rock
- Years active: 2002–2009 (on hiatus)
- Labels: Credential, ForeFront
- Members: Zach Zegan; Kevin Dickson; Tomaš Samiec; Jeňa Pospíšil; Jaime Hays
- Past members: Josh Zegan; Jon Howard; Nick Aranda; Clayton Hunt
- Website: dizmas.com

Dizmas is an American Christian rock band from Lancaster, California.

== History ==
Nick Aranda, Clayton Hunt and brothers Zach and Josh Zegan began playing together as teenagers in 1998 while attending Desert Christian High School in Lancaster, California. They were later joined by Jon Howard, who is from Mechanicsburg, Pennsylvania.

Their debut album "On a Search in America" was released on June 21, 2005. Jon Howard's younger brother, Joey, joined Dizmas as a roadie/merch guy/techie in 2006, now serving as tour manager. On May 3, 2006, their song "Revolution" aired on "CSI: NY – Season 2: Stealing Home". Their second album "Tension" was produced by Steve Wilson and released on May 5, 2007. On July 10, 2007, their song "Shake It Off" aired on ESPN. Soon after their hit single "Play It Safe" reached No. 1 on Radio & Records Christian Rock National Airplay chart of national broadcasters in the United States for the week ending Aug 03, 2007. In fall 2008, the band had their last tour in Czech Republic which led to a break. In response to their rising success, The Miami New Times noted Dizmas's unique talents in their "2007 Music Year in Review" piece.

After returning from the Czech Republic the band said that they would be going on hiatus. Jon Howard went on to join Stellar Kart, but left in the summer of 2010 to tour as a stage guitarist for Paramore. Howard has continued in this position despite changes to the official line-up of Paramore until 2016.

In spring 2009, Zach Zegan created a new band for playing in the Czech Republic on "EXIT Tour" - 2009 through 2013. The band continued to tour with EXIT Tour using various musicians Zegan had either toured with in the past or mentored. The band stayed in this style as EXIT Tour expanded from not only the Czech Republic but also into Slovakia and Poland. In December 2013, the group went on an indefinite break to allow the group to explore other areas of ministry and music projects.

== Band members ==
Current

- Zach Zegan – lead vocalist
- Kevin Dickson – rhythm guitar, background vocals
- Tomaš Samiec – lead guitar
- Jeňa Pospíšil – bass guitar
- Jaime Hays – drums

Former

- Josh Zegan – rhythm guitar, backing vocals (1998—2009)
- Jon Howard – lead guitar (2003—2009) (Now touring with Paramore)
- Nick Aranda – bass guitar (1998—2009) (Now in The Rocket Summer and Paper Route)
- Clayton Hunt – drums (1998—2009)
- Kevin Dickson - rhythm guitar, backing vocals (2011-current)
- Tomaš Samiec - lead guitar (2011-current)
- Jeňa Pospíšil – bass guitar (2009-current)
- Josh Redd – drums (2010-2011) (Now with A Current Affair (band))
- Jacob Cornell – rhythm guitar, background vocals (2009-2011) (Now with IGEN Music)
- Sam Ortega – guitar, background vocals (2009-2011)
- Jaime Hays – drums (2009-2010, 2011-current)
- Mario Gonzalez – bass guitar (2009) (Now in The Black and The White)
- Keoni Chock – lead guitar (2000—2003)
- Daniel Schaaff - lead guitar (1998–2000)

== Discography ==
Studio albums

- On a Search in America (2005)
- Tension (2007)
- Dizmas (2008)

EPs

- Redemption, Passion, Glory (2006)
- The Between EP (2000)

Compilation albums

- Stereocilia Vol. 1 (2006)
