= I Surrender Dear (disambiguation) =

"I Surrender Dear" is a 1931 jazz song.

I Surrender Dear may also refer to:

- I Surrender Dear (1931 film), a 1931 film directed by Mack Sennett and starring Bing Crosby
- I Surrender Dear (1948 film), a 1948 film directed by Arthur Dreifuss and starring Gloria Jean
- I Surrender Dear (album), a 2019 album by Peter Brötzmann

== See also ==
- I Surrender (disambiguation)
