= Dizmas (album) =

Studio album by Dizmas
- Released: April 29, 2008
- Genre: Christian rock
- Label: Forefront
- Producer: Steven Wilson, Rob Hawkins

Dizmas chronology
Tension (2005)	Dizmas (2008)

Professional ratings
Review scores
Source	Rating
evade the noise	4/5 stars

Dizmas is the third studio album by Christian rock band Dizmas. The self-titled album is a collection of some of the band's most popular songs, plus four new songs titled "Yours," "Save the Day," "Different," and "Worth Fighting For". The album was released on April 29, 2008 under Forefront Records.

== Track listing ==
1. "Yours"
2. "Play It Safe"
3. "Save the Day"
4. "Redemption, Passion, Glory"
5. "Different"
6. "Shake It Off"
7. "Jealousy Hurts"
8. "This Is A Warning"
9. "Worth Fighting For"
10. "Dance"

== Personnel ==
- Zach Zegan – lead vocals
- Josh Zegan– guitar, backing vocals
- Jon Howard - guitar
- Clayton Hunt - drums
- Nick Aranda - bass

== Sources ==
- www.jesusfreakhideout.com
