= Tension (Dizmas album) =

Studio album by Dizmas
- Released: May 22, 2007
- Genre: Christian rock
- Length: 41:00
- Label: Credential
- Producer: Steven Wilson

Dizmas chronology
On a Search in America (2005)	Tension (2007)	Dizmas (2008)

Professional ratings
Review scores
Source	Rating
AllMusic	link
Jesus Freak Hideout	link

Tension is the second studio album by Christian rock band Dizmas. It was released on Credential Recordings in 2007.

== Track listing ==
1. "Jealousy Hurts" – 2:36
2. "Shake It Off" – 2:35
3. "Play It Safe" – 3:24
4. "If You Love Someone" – 4:00
5. "See Daylight" – 2:42
6. "Dance" – 2:10
7. "This Is A Warning" – 3:28
8. "The Voice Is Ghostly" – 3:12
9. "Nothing At All" – 7:24
10. "October" – 3:37
11. "Until You Rescued Me" – 3:36
12. "Sun" – 2:17

== Personnel ==
- Zach Zegan – lead vocals
- Josh Zegan – guitar, backing vocals
- Jon Howard – guitar
- Clayton Hunt – drums
- Nick Aranda – bass guitar
