= Jon Howard =

American musician

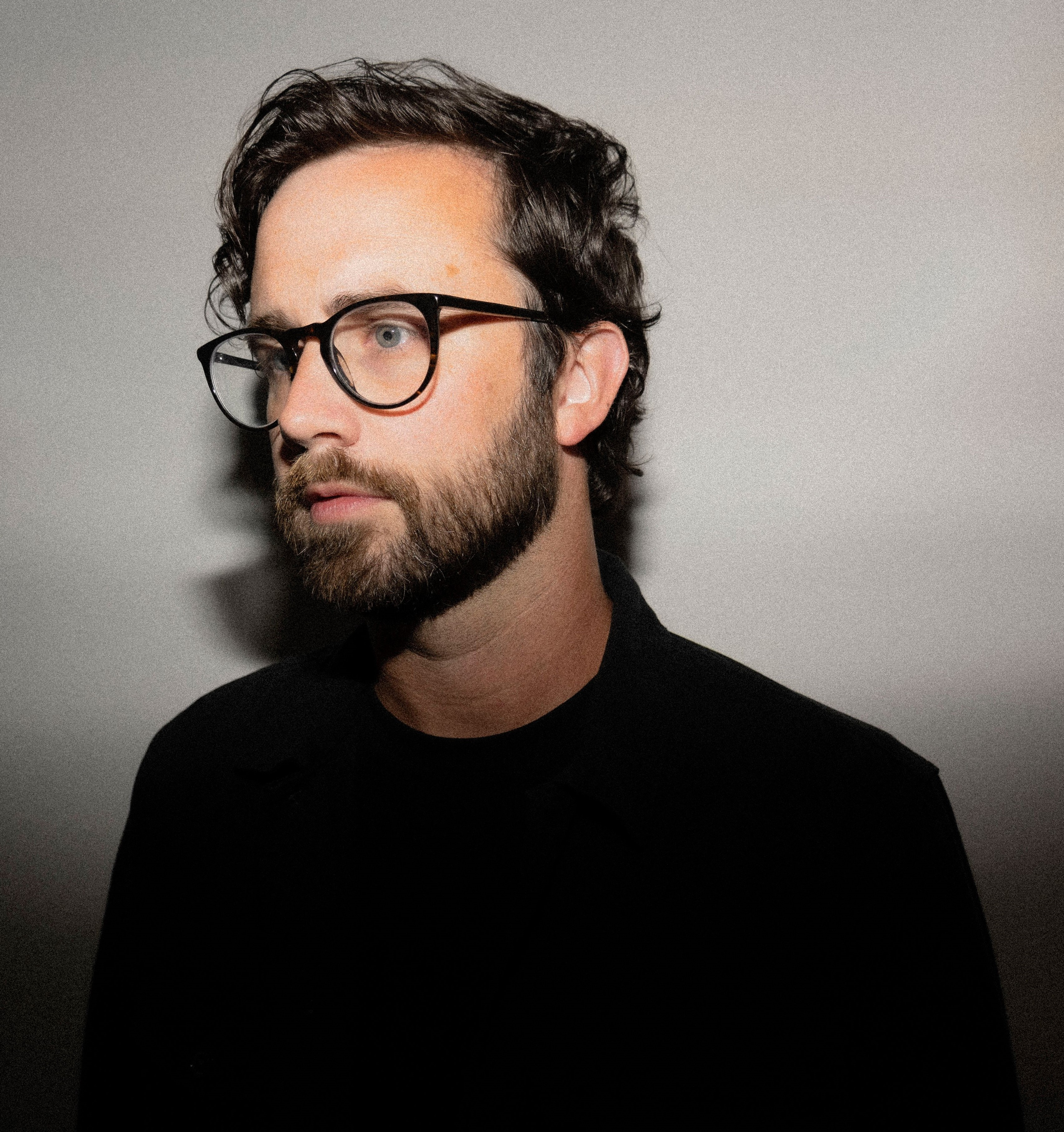

Background information
- Birth name: Jonathan Michael Howard
- Born: 27 April 1985 (age 40); Mechanicsburg, Pennsylvania, U.S.
- Genres: Alternative rock; pop
- Occupation(s): Musician, singer, songwriter, record producer, mixing engineer
- Instruments: Guitar; piano; keyboards; vocals; percussion
- Years active: 2004–present
- Website: theanchorroom.net

Jonathan Michael Howard (born April 27, 1985, in Mechanicsburg, Pennsylvania) is an American musician, songwriter, mixing engineer, record producer and entrepreneur.

== Career ==
=== Early years ===
In 2004, shortly after graduating high-school, Howard moved to Lancaster, California to join the Forefront Records band, Dizmas. After hundreds of shows and three records, members of Dizmas moved on. Howard was the lead guitarist for the rock band Dizmas from 2003 to 2009, leaving after they went on hiatus and becoming a guitarist for the band Stellar Kart until he left the band in 2010.

=== Paramore ===
In the summer of 2010, Howard began touring with the band Paramore as an additional rhythm guitar player, keyboardist and percussionist. He maintained this position until he left in 2016 - he played his last shows as part of Paramore in March of that year, during the band's second "Parahoy! Cruise". Jon's brother, Joey, joined Paramore as a touring bassist in 2016.

=== Production and Writing ===
Howard has co-written and produced songs performed by Dashboard Confessional, Illenium, Aaron Gillespie, Seven Lions, MiTis, and Natalie Taylor among others. He has mixed and/or produced songs for Jon Foreman, New Found Glory, Bayside, and Halfnoise.

In 2021, Howard was the co-songwriter and the vocal producer for the track Fragments of the American DJ Illenium's Album, Fallen Embers. The album was nominated for the 64th Annual Grammy Awards's Best Dance/Electronic Album in 2022.

He is a frequent collaborator of his wife Natalie Taylor, with whom he co-wrote and produced her Platinum-selling song, Surrender.

== Avvay ==
In 2018, Howard co-founded the location scouting company, Avvay. Avvay's platform allows artists to book locations for photo and recording sessions, video shoots, and performances.

== Personal life ==
Howard is married to singer Natalie Taylor. They reside in Franklin, Tennessee with their two children.
