= Surender =

Surender may refer to:

- Surender Reddy, Tollywood film director
- Surender Mohan Pathak, author
- Surender Pal Singh, member of Bharatiya Janata Party (BJP) from Rajasthan
- Surender Pal Ratawal, leader of Bharatiya Janata Party from Delhi
- Surender Singh Barwala, BJP politician from Hisar, Haryana

== See also ==
- S. N. Surendar (born 1953), Indian playback singer, actor and voice actor
- Surendar Valasai (born 1968), Pakistani journalist
- Surrender (disambiguation)
