= Natalie Taylor (singer) =

American singer and songwriter

- Born: Natalie Taylor; August 7, 1986 (age 39); Birmingham, Alabama
- Occupations: Singer; songwriter
- Years active: 2015-present
- Spouse: Jon Howard
- Musical career
- Genres: Folk
- Instrument: Vocals; piano; guitar
- Website: natalietaylormusic.com

Natalie Taylor is an American singer-songwriter. She is known for her emotionally-driven songs. Her songs have soundtracked many television shows, commercials, and viral videos.

== Career ==
Taylor started singing when she was a child and when she was a teenager started writing songs.

In 2014, Taylor's song "Love Life" was featured in a BareMinerals commercial which kicked-off a long-standing marriage of Natalie's music with film and television.

In 2015, Taylor's EP Wildfire was released independently. In the same year, her song "I Want It All" was featured in the documentary The True Cost.

Taylor released the single "Surrender" on October 29, 2015, which she co-wrote with her husband Jon Howard. The song became a sleeper hit in 2020 after receiving virality. The song was certified Platinum in the US and Canada. "Surrender" also spent time on radio's Hot AC Top 30. In 2020, it was reissued under an exclusive license by Columbia Records.

In 2020, her version of the Steppenwolf song "Born to Be Wild" was featured in an advertisement for Volvo cars.

In 2021, Taylor released an EP titled Covers, Vol. 1 including various covers of hers as heard in television shows such as Grey's Anatomy, Lucifer and World of Dance.

In July 2021, Taylor appeared on the track "Fragments" with American DJ Illenium which was featured on his fourth album, "Fallen Embers". "Fallen Embers" was nominated for a Grammy Award in 2022 for Best Dance/Electronic Album.

== Discography ==
=== Extended plays ===
List of extended plays
Title	Details
Natalie Taylor	Released: October 2010; Label: self-released; Formats: Digital download
Wildfire	Released: April 2015; Label: self-released; Formats: Digital download
Covers Vol 1	Released: March 2021; Label: self-released; Formats: Digital download, streaming

=== Singles ===
Title	Year	Peak position			Certifications
Title	Year	US Digital	AUS	UK	Certifications
"Love Life"	2014	—	—	—	
"Latch"	2014	—	—	—	
"Come to This"	2014	—	—	—	
"I Want it All"	2015	—	—	—	
"Amen"	2016	—	—	—	
"Loved You Before"	2016	—	—	—	
"In the Air Tonight"	2016	—	—	—	
"Control" (Piano version)	2017	—	—	—	
"Collapsed"	2018	—	—	—	
"Have Yourself a Merry Little Christmas"	2018	—	—	—	
"Jumper"	2019	—	—	—	
"Iris"	2019	—	—	—	
"You Were Mine"	2019	—	—	—	
"I'll Stand by You"	2019	—	—	—	
"Surrender"	2019	33	79	58	RIAA: Platinum; BPI: Silver
"Secondhand"	2020	—	—	—	
"For a Reason"	2021	—	—	—	
"Wrecked"	2021	—	—	—	
"Love Is the Answer"	2021	—	—	—	
"Fragments" (with Illenium)	2021	—	—	—	64th Annual Grammy Awards nomination
"More Than a Feeling"	2022	—	—	—	
"Hang On To Me" (featuring Donovan Woods)	2022	—	—	—	
"White Christmas"	2022	—	—	—	
"Walls"	2023	—	—	—	
"Pure Imagination"	2023	—	—	—	
"I Wanna Know" (with Seven Lions and MiTis)	2024	—	—	—	

== Personal life ==
Natalie resides in Franklin, Tennessee, alongside her husband and collaborator, Jon Howard, and their two children.
