= List of Charmed (2018 TV series) episodes =

Charmed is an American fantasy drama television series developed by Jennie Snyder Urman, Jessica O'Toole and Amy Rardin based on the original series created by Constance M. Burge. It premiered on October 14, 2018, on The CW. The show follows the life of three sisters who are destined to battle the forces of evil.

The third season premiered on January 24, 2021. On February 3, 2021, The CW renewed the series for a fourth season which premiered on March 11, 2022. On May 12, 2022, The CW canceled the series after four seasons. During the course of the series, 72 episodes of Charmed aired, between October 14, 2018, and June 10, 2022.

== Series overview ==
Season	Episodes	Originally released		Rank	Average viewers (in millions)
Season	Episodes	First released	Last released	Rank	Average viewers (in millions)
1	22	October 14, 2018	May 19, 2019	139	0.85
2	19	October 11, 2019	May 1, 2020	129	0.63
3	18	January 24, 2021	July 23, 2021	152	0.38
4	13	March 11, 2022	June 10, 2022	135	0.35

== Episodes ==
=== Season 1 (2018–2019) ===
No. overall	No. in season	Title	Directed by	Written by	Original release date	U.S. viewers (millions)
1	1	"Pilot"	Brad Silberling	Teleplay by : Jessica O'Toole & Amy Rardin; Story by : Jessica O'Toole & Amy Rardin & Jennie Snyder Urman & Constance M. Burge	October 14, 2018	1.57
After a frantic text orders them to come home, sisters Maggie and Mel Vera discover their mother Marisol has been murdered. Three months later, the sisters are estranged; Mel blames Maggie for Marisol's death, and Maggie leaves home for a chance to join a sorority. Molecular geneticist Macy Vaughn is hired at Hilltowne University under Professor Thaine, reinstated after being accused of sexual harassment. Macy introduces herself to Maggie and Mel as their half-sister, and the three are brought before Harry Greenwood, their "Whitelighter". He explains that they are witches, and their mother had tried to undo the binding spells she placed to hide their powers before she was killed; Harry gives them 48 hours to accept their powers or return to their original lives. After Macy helps Maggie exorcise a demon from her ex, Brian, they realize everything Harry said is true. Mel is trapped by Thaine, actually the archdemon Taydeus. Macy, Maggie, and Mel are able to use the "Power of Three" to kill Taydeus, but learn he is not the demon who killed their mother. Mel finds an ouija board that the sisters use to contact Marisol's spirit; she warns them not to trust Harry.
2	2	"Let This Mother Out"	Vanessa Parise	Jessica O'Toole & Amy Rardin	October 21, 2018	1.32
After Harry warns that ouija boards are easily manipulated by evil spirits, the sisters plan to use a truth serum on Harry. While obtaining an ingredient, Macy learns about a "black blob" that escaped from the university lab. Maggie finds her power makes it difficult to have a social life. Mel uses the board against Harry's instructions, and Macy is forced to destroy it to protect her, driving a wedge between them. The truth serum is accidentally given to Niko instead of Harry, and she admits to cheating on Mel with her ex-fiancee. Maggie persuades her sister to help free Marisol's spirit from the spirit board. Marisol reveals that Harry killed her and plans to steal their powers. The sisters are told to trap him with the Prism of Souls, but a doubtful Mel stabs Marisol, exposing her as an Imposter Demon, and Maggie destroys her by using her phone as a mirror. Harry begins training the sisters, and informs them the blob is a form of the Harbinger, the demon whose arrival foretells the apocalypse. The Harbinger chooses a coma patient, Angela Wu, as its host.
3	3	"Sweet Tooth"	Michael Allowitz	Joey Falco	October 28, 2018	1.13
The sisters' training is not going well, and Maggie juggles her duties to her sorority and as a Charmed One. Harry forces Mel to wear a tracking talisman as punishment for misusing her power. When Maggie uses magic to throw a party at their house, she persuades her sisters to use it as an opportunity to lure the Harbinger, and tries to help Macy spice up her costume for Gavin. After learning that three virgins have been killed and drained of their blood, the sisters and Harry try to seal off the house, though not before Angela, now a full demon, enters. Mel tells Harry that she feels smothered because she has never had to hide who she is. The protection spell fails, exposing Angela's presence; Macy, a virgin, uses her own blood to lure it outside. The binding spell fails, due to the consequences of Maggie using magic for personal gain, and Mel casts a forbidden spell to defeat Angela, nearly killing Macy. Harry reveals that he is over-protective because Fiona, another witch he served, killed herself after being institutionalized. The sisters chain up the Harbinger in the attic until their superiors, the Elders, arrive.
4	4	"Exorcise Your Demons"	Melanie Mayron	Marcos Luevanos	November 4, 2018	0.96
Niko and her partner Trip question the sisters about Angela, but Elder Charity Callahan throws them off the trail. Charity explains Angela is beyond saving, and must be killed using the Power of Three. Mel and Maggie are against the decision, but Macy agrees. Lucy asks Parker to help an overwhelmed Maggie study for her midterm. Mel discovers Angela's soul is intact, meaning she can be saved. Charity refuses an exorcism, so Mel and Maggie abduct Angela. Harry tracks them down, but agrees to help. Charity reveals that, years ago, she cast a spell on Marisol that erased her pain from abandoning Macy. The sisters learn their mother wrote a secret exorcism spell, based in Santería, that only they can use. When Parker unexpectedly arrives, Maggie kisses him and he leaves. The girls recite the spell and exorcise the Harbinger; however, Trip, who had been following them, is killed by flying debris. Maggie decides she wants to study on her own. Through Niko, Mel learns that Charity covered up Trip's death by framing him for Angela's crimes. A mysterious man uses a hypnotic suggestion to compel Charity to give him the vessel holding the Harbinger.
5	5	"Other Women"	Amyn Kaderali	George Northy	November 11, 2018	0.95
Mel, worried about Niko after Trip's death, invites her over for dinner. Macy meets billionaire Alastair Caine, who is interested in her work, and learns Galvin has started a relationship with Summer. Parker dumps Lucy, who asks Maggie to find the girl he "cheated" on her with. Niko reveals Trip was investigating a link between Marisol's death and two other murders; Mel tells her to drop it. Hunter, a shapeshifter working for Caine, traps Niko, but Mel saves her from a fire and later thwarts another attempt on her life. Summer turns out not to be a succubus, but Macy notices a strange mark on Galvin. Harry recommends using the Power of Three to change history and prevent Niko and Mel from ever meeting, but warns that doing so will erase every trace of their relationship. The spell goes through, and Mel is heartbroken. Maggie admits to Lucy that she kissed Parker, and is expelled from Kappa. Mel learns that, as a consequence of the spell, she missed an important interview and no longer has a job at the university. Caine tells Hunter, his son, that they must acquire DNA from the sisters in order to steal their powers.
6	6	"Kappa Spirit"	Jeff Byrd	Emmylou Diaz	November 18, 2018	0.96
Harry believes Galvin's mark to be demonic, and arranges for Mel to interview for an administrative job in his office. Caine orders blood tests for everyone in the university lab. Lucy falls under the influence of Brenda Mancini, who fell to her death while drunk in 1989 after being rejected as a pledge, and has returned as a revenant. The sisters see a memory of their mother pregnant with Macy, and fear for her health. Mel and Maggie find the pledges tied up, and suspect Brenda will use Lucy to take revenge on Jenna, the girl she blames for her death. Jenna reveals that since Brenda's death, there have been multiple similar deaths at Kappa, and the sisters realize Brenda intends to kill Lucy next. Macy contacts a Yoruba priestess, and is warned that Galvin's mark indicates a "darkness" within her since birth. Maggie and Mel attempt to destroy Brenda, but their spell fails. Brenda hypnotizes Lucy into attempting suicide, but Harry saves her and Maggie earns her forgiveness, removing Brenda's power. Maggie agrees to give Lucy space until she is ready to fix their friendship. Hunter steals Macy's blood sample, and Macy finds a key hidden behind a plaque at home.
7	7	"Out of Scythe"	Jamie Travis	Sarah Goldfinger	November 25, 2018	0.87
Maggie debates dropping out of college to focus on her spellcraft. The new lab director, Julia Wagner, offers Macy a supervisor position if she dismisses Galvin. A satyr, Leon, informs the sisters that a shadow demon has stolen his shard of the Scythe of Tartarus – reassembled, it can release imprisoned demons. Parker takes Maggie on a date, but when they kiss, she reads his mind, revealing he has a secret. She catches him using what seems to be drugs. Another shard is stolen from the fertility goddess Sela, and a swarm of insects leads the girls to the final shard. Using Macy's key, the sisters discover the final shard is a beacon. They set a trap, but the demon reforges the Scythe, which a mysterious girl steals; she disappears and the demon escapes. The sisters promise to be more honest with each other, and Macy persuades Wagner to keep Galvin. Maggie decides to stay in school, but Mel chooses to leave. Parker explains the drugs treat an autoimmune disease that will cut his life short. He visits Caine, his father, who berates him for his failure to retrieve the Scythe, and tells him to stay close to Maggie.
8	8	"Bug a Boo"	Vanessa Parise	Zoe Marshall	December 2, 2018	0.93
Hunting for the mysterious girl, Mel scours the Book of Shadows with Harry and Charity. They discover a group of cicada demons are using a dating app to attract prey. When Macy is ensnared, the girls rescue her and kill the queen, saving the other victims. Parker tries to convince Maggie to take an internship at his father's company, since interns must submit blood samples, but fails. Caine rebukes Parker that the serum they are working on is the only thing that can reverse his condition; Hunter defends Parker. Macy learns Galvin's research has been cut, and he and Summer have ended their relationship. Parker tells Maggie he needs a plasma transplant, and she agrees to help. The mysterious girl approaches Mel, introducing herself as Jada, a member of the Sisters of Arcana (Sarcana), a rogue group of witches. She explains that Marisol was an ally, and they used the Scythe to free a powerful witch imprisoned by the Elders. Mel discusses these revelations with Charity, who, with the Elders, instruct her to join the Sarcana to spy on them. Macy decides to rekindle her romance with Galvin, only for him to be struck by a car.
9	9	"Jingle Hell"	Michael Lange	Jessica O'Toole & Amy Rardin	December 9, 2018	0.94
In Romania, the Caine brothers steal an amulet from the body of Saint Dragos, killing the priest guarding it. The sisters prepare for Christmas, but an injured Galvin arrives looking for Macy. Wagner tells Parker, her son, that he must drain the sisters' magic with the amulet to save himself. Jada inducts Mel into the Sarcana. Macy notices Parker reacts adversely to Galvin's mark, suspecting his demonic nature; Hunter ties her up and takes her place. Mel notices the artifact, but Maggie refuses to accept that her boyfriend might have evil intentions. Unable to live with his deception, Parker removes the amulet, restoring the stolen magic. Hunter confronts Parker, revealing the amulet is necessary to turn him into the "Source", a being of pure darkness. He tries to kill the sisters, but Parker fights him off and Mel uses her new Mark of the Sarcana to drive him away with a flock of crows. Parker carries Maggie off to explain, but she rejects him. Jada tells Mel the Sarcana tried to protect Marisol. Hunter returns, and the sisters banish him to Tartarus with Parker's help, but Harry and the staff are pulled down with Hunter, and Galvin discovers their secret.
10	10	"Keep Calm and Harry On"	Vanessa Parise	Allyssa Lee	January 20, 2019	0.82
The Elders refuse to help rescue Harry. Heartbroken over Parker, Maggie uses magic to take away her pain. Mel learns from Jada that the nearest gateway to Tartarus is guarded by a demon, Dante, and the Sarcana need Hellfire to heal one of their own. Mel decides to trade the Harbinger to Dante for Harry. Accepting that Macy is a witch, Galvin helps her break into Wagner's office, where they find evidence she is experimenting with demon DNA. Charity reluctantly gives the sisters the vessel holding the Harbinger; giving it to Dante, they discover it is empty. Maggie's powers falter, and Dante traps her in Tartarus. Mel and Macy get Parker to help steal the Harbinger from Alastair; Mel also steals Hellfire for the Sarcana. Alastair compels Wagner to reveal what happened to Hunter, and intercepts the sisters as they rescue Harry and Maggie. Through love, Maggie creates a new spell, nearly vanquishing Alastair before he escapes. Charity reveals to Harry that his son, who he thought dead, is still alive. Mel gives Jada the Hellfire and they kiss, which Niko secretly records. Galvin shows Macy files indicating she and Maggie share parents, while Mel only shares a mother.
11	11	"Witch Perfect"	Gina Rodriguez	Natalia Fernandez	January 27, 2019	0.88
Maggie auditions for the Hilltones, the university's a cappella group, where she reconnects with Lucy. Neither of Macy's sisters take Galvin's findings well. Through magic, Macy learns Marisol and her father Dexter secretly kept in touch until he died. Betrayed, Mel comes clean to Jada about her mission, and they share a kiss, which Niko photographs. The choir director, Mr. Miranda, cuts the Hilltones' soloist; when she complains, he steals her soul using an enchanted pitch pipe. Maggie accidentally touches the instrument, arousing her suspicions. Macy and Harry realize Miranda has turned the Hilltones into sirens, so he can absorb their audience's souls. Mel helps Jada expose a sexual predator, but is interrupted by Niko, now a private investigator trying to find Jada. Maggie rallies the Hilltones to disrupt the spell. Using the Power of Three, the sisters release the demon controlling Mr. Miranda, which Galvin imprisons in the pitch pipe and frees the soloist. Harry decides he is no longer fit to serve as a Whitelighter. Reading Dexter's letters with Macy, Maggie learns that he and Marisol resurrected Macy from the dead when she was a child.
12	12	"You're Dead to Me"	Brad Silberling	Michael Reisz	February 17, 2019	0.77
Macy summons Knansie, the necromancer who resurrected her, unaware she has broken a spell shielding her from Cyd, a witch who seeks to kill her. Despite Maggie's warnings, Mel meets Niko and learns wiping her memory caused her to quit the force. Macy bonds with Knansie, learning necromancy can "turn" (corrupt) resurrected beings. Harry accidentally strands himself and Mel in Manchester, forcing him to reveal that his powers are unbalanced. Rather than lose him as a Whitelighter, she agrees to help find his son. Cyd attacks the house, but Macy subdues her. Maggie goes to a party where Parker is bartending, but refuses to forgive him. Cyd takes Maggie hostage to force Macy to give her Knansie. Harry and Mel find church records revealing his name is James Westwall, and his son is named Carter. Macy nearly kills Cyd before Maggie stops her, and explains Knansie has been turning everyone she resurrects in a demonic pact; Parker tricks her into breaking the pact, and she turns to dust. Harry sees Carter as an old man, finding closure. Macy makes a deal with Wagner to remove her darkness. Caine tasks Lucy, his accomplice, to ensure she and Parker get back together.
13	13	"Manic Pixie Nightmare"	Melanie Mayron	Jessica O'Toole & Amy Rardin	March 3, 2019	0.74
Parker asks Maggie to look into a classmate's suicide, only to have the same thing happen to another man in front of the sisters. The culprit is Chloe, a pixie in human form; Harry remarks that pixies are typically benevolent. Galvin asks Macy to contact his late grandmother's spirit for help combating her darkness, and she explains Galvin must perform a cleansing ritual. Chloe goes after Parker, whose powers have been suppressed by his mother, and Maggie narrowly saves him from walking in front of a bus. Jada informs Mel that her adoptive parents want to meet. The sisters try to trap Chloe, but she hypnotizes Harry, using him to escape. Zack, a luckless film student, is controlling Chloe to dispose of his classmates, and intends to sacrifice Harry and steal his magic. Maggie and Parker break Chloe's hold over Harry, while Mel frees her from Zack's control. After sending Chloe on her way, Mel uses a Sarcana hex to compel Zack to turn himself in. Maggie kisses Parker, admitting she is ready to forgive him, but still fears his demon half. Going to meet Jada's supposed parents, Jada and Mel are ambushed by two witch hunters, who wound Jada.
14	14	"Touched by a Demon"	Stuart Gillard	Joey Falco	March 10, 2019	0.74
A remorseful Niko asks Jada for help setting a trap for the witch hunters. Macy burns her hand without feeling it, which Harry divines as a sign of demonic influence. Upset, she accidentally brings Gideon and Levi, two angels from 90s TV show Heaven's Vice, to life. Maggie is too emotional to be intimate with Parker, annoying him. Macy defeats a demon escaped from the show by convincing him that he is not real, which the angels overhear. Macy persuades them to return to their show, but Levi sends her and Harry back instead. Jada and Mel defeat the witch hunters with magic, and Jada notes how little the Elders have trained Mel. With only fifteen minutes before the show ends, Macy has her sisters capture Gideon and Levi, while she and Harry allow themselves to be captured by the show's "devil" and kill him with his own horn. Mel opens a portal to return the angels, and Macy decides to ask Charity for help; a distrustful Mel refuses to have any part. Maggie and Parker finally have sex, only for Parker's powers to transport them to a chamber beneath the house, while a mysterious woman awakens beside a raven.
15	15	"Switches & Stones"	Claudia Yarmy	George Northy	March 17, 2019	0.65
Meeting with the Elders, Charity and Macy are summoned by Harry to the chamber under the sisters' house – a "Vortex Viribus" of intense magical power. Jada reveals to Mel that the Keeper of the Sacred Flame, an ally of the Sarcana, is really Fiona, Charity's missing sister. The Vortex Viribus enhances Maggie's powers, causing her to switch bodies with Mel. Macy discovers her powers may have turned a man to stone, but Harry determines a demon is responsible. Mel is forced to attend sorority events on her sister's behalf, while Maggie spies on Jada and grows to accept her as Mel's girlfriend. Macy learns the demon is Medusa, whom Charity wants to kill over Macy's objections. The sisters discover a pledge named Daphne unintentionally summoned Medusa after confronting a frat boy who slut-shamed her. Macy realizes Medusa does not curse those who look at her, only those who look away, and convinces her to restore her victims and leave the mortal realm. Mel gets Parker and Lucy to expel the frat boys responsible for Daphne's shaming. Macy asks Charity if she could learn to use her demon powers for good; using them reveals that Charity was responsible for Marisol's murder.
16	16	"Memento Mori"	Norman Buckley	Emmylou Diaz	March 24, 2019	0.59
Charity uses her magic to wipe Macy's memories. The sisters agree to keep Fiona's secret. When Macy starts regaining her memories, Charity mind-wipes her again, lying to Macy that her demon side is growing stronger. Parker learns his mother is close to completely erasing his demonic side. Macy and Harry discover the body of Elder Priyanka Bari in the attic, and Macy is convinced she killed her. Charity proposes binding Macy's powers, but Harry warns this could permanently destroy the Power of Three. Against Charity's instructions, Mel and Maggie consult Wagner, which only feeds their doubts. Macy recovers her memories and realizes she anticipated Charity wiping them. Charity appears, seals Macy in the Vortex, and tries to kill her. Macy manages to distract her by mentioning Fiona, as Mel and Maggie subdue Charity and use the Vortex to strip her of her powers. The sisters discover that Charity killed Marisol to stop her from unbinding their abilities, but Marisol finished the spell with her dying breath. Fiona taunts the fallen Charity for her crimes. Lucy poisons Parker to force him to seek his father's help. Alastair rescues Charity from being sent to Tartarus.
17	17	"Surrender"	Megan Follows	Sarah Goldfinger	March 31, 2019	0.70
The Council scapegoats Harry for Charity's actions, stripping him of his powers and immortality. Niko asks Mel for help with Scarlet, a young woman who escaped a cult led by the demon Viralis, who feeds on women to maintain his virility. Wagner tells Maggie that only demon blood can save Parker. Harry informs the sisters that his body is rapidly aging, requiring a new Whitelighter to be appointed. Jada refuses to help save Harry's life, so Mel ends their relationship. Instead, she uses her powers in public to force the Council to summon them, only to be reprimanded and sent back. Scarlet is abducted, and the sisters learn Viralis can only be killed with his own knife. Maggie offers herself as bait, assuming Viralis cannot control her, but he does and escapes. Harry uses a spell to allow the sisters to track him. Viralis feeds Maggie his blood and sends her to kill them. Fiona cannot read Harry's mind, as he no longer has his magic. Macy defeats Viralis and Maggie gives the demon's blood to Wagner. Fiona defies Jada and restores Harry's immortality to probe his mind, but he resists. Furious, she teleports away with him.
18	18	"The Replacement"	Greg Beeman	Zoe Marshall & Marcos Luevanos	April 21, 2019	0.67
The sisters meet their new Whitelighter, Tessa. Galvin returns with a way to cure Macy of her demon side, but Tessa learns a customs official he met has been killed. Macy and Mel seek Madame Roz's advice. Mel tends bar at Niko and Greta's bachelorette party, and Maggie, who must now pay tuition, is uncomfortable using her black heritage to apply for scholarships. Galvin, having been possessed by a demon, kills Madame Roz. Maggie uses her expanded powers to communicate with Roz's departing soul and Galvin's displaced one. They deduce Galvin is controlled by an Akibu demon, a parasite who can find a permanent host in someone who died as a child, like Macy. They go to her rescue and Macy forces the Akibu out by temporarily stopping Galvin's heart. Maggie makes the demon visible with fire extinguisher foam, and Mel kills it with Roz's dagger. When Macy tells Galvin she no longer wants to be rid of her demon side, he breaks up with her. Niko tells Mel the Sarcana's hideout has been ransacked, and Mel reveals she is a witch. She finds the Sarcana massacred by Fiona; Jada, the only survivor, confirms Fiona had Harry under her control.
19	19	"Source Material"	Stuart Gillard	Natalia Fernandez & Allyssa Lee	April 28, 2019	0.71
The Charmed Ones tell Tessa that Harry is alive and with Fiona, hoping to follow her to them, but Tessa evades Mel, who accepts Niko's help to track her down. Julia has nearly made Parker fully human, but he suffers a reaction and appears to accidentally kill her. Macy and Galvin find her body and Galvin is disturbed when Macy covers up the death, later telling her he is joining Doctors Without Borders. Macy uses her evil sight to uncover the truth: Caine had Charity free Hunter from Tartarus, after which he killed Julia, impersonated her to inject Parker with demon blood, and impersonated Maggie so Parker would think she had rejected him. The Charmed Ones and Tessa find Fiona forcing Harry to help her retrieve the Origin Dagger, which she intends to use with the Flame of All Power to destroy all magic. A fight sees Tessa killed and Fiona escape, although Harry is freed. Caine retrieves the dagger and the Charmed Ones and Harry realize the Flame and the Source are the same thing. Niko tells Mel she left the police because of a nervous breakdown she believes was supernatural. Parker goes to Caine, embracing his demon side.
20	20	"Ambush"	Jeff Byrd	Mia Katherine Iverson	May 5, 2019	0.60
Elder Devorah Silver turns to the Charmed Ones for help after several Elders are found dead. They reveal what they have learned about the Sacred Flame and the Source of All Evil. Macy finds a spell in Galvin's objects that will help them remove Fiona's immortality, but when she casts it, Fiona fights back, prompting Macy to use her demon side. Alastair convinces Fiona to help him take down the Elders. Niko tells Mel she has been thinking about her, and they kiss. More Elders turn up dead, prompting the remaining Elders and the Charmed Ones to take action, but the plan goes awry when Hunter kills most of the Elders, leaving only Elder Silver. The sisters find a secret basement in which their mother prepared weapons for them for the upcoming battle, and they use them to vanquish Hunter. Elder Silver dies, and the Harbinger is released from within Hunter to unleash its deadly virus on humanity. Mel tells Niko about their history, and Niko collapses. Fiona goes after Charity, the last remaining Elder, but she escapes.
21	21	"Red Rain"	Anya Adams	Michael Reisz	May 12, 2019	0.63
Galvin calls the Charmed Ones to the hospital to investigate a series of Hilltowne students who have fallen ill from the Harbinger's deadly virus. Niko is transported to the same hospital, but Harry believes her condition is due to Mel's revelation, which made Niko's brain unable to cope with memories from two separate realities. Parker tells Maggie to find Charity, as she is the last Elder. When they do, Parker reveals himself in demonic form and fights Mel and Maggie before the latter brings out his human side. As more people fall to the virus, Galvin and Macy work on the Haitian spell to extract it from the victims, but at a price: Galvin's life. Fiona kills Charity, and Alastor takes Maggie hostage. When they reach the enemy's destination, Fiona ignites the Sacred Flame, but without her immortality, she is killed in the process. Parker wants to save Maggie; Macy, with her demon side, takes the Origin Dagger from Parker and absorbs the Sacred Flame to become the Source. With her newfound powers, she vanquishes Alastor and removes everyone's memory about the recent incident. She then goes to Galvin's body and resurrects him.
22	22	"The Source Awakens"	Vanessa Parise	Jessica O'Toole & Amy Rardin & Carter Covington	May 19, 2019	0.59
Mel, Maggie, and Harry express their worries about Macy's new condition. Galvin is feeling out of place, and some of the victims from the Harbinger's virus die as a consequence of Macy bringing Galvin back. When they express this concern to Macy, she begins rewriting realities to bring back Marisol. When they meet, Marisol dies and Macy's sisters turn on her, prompting her to rewrite it again. This time, Mel is the one who grew up without her family. She meets Harry in Seattle, and their memories collide, prompting them to retrieve their rightful memories and find Maggie. When Macy finds out about this and almost kills Mel with telekinesis, Harry orbs them away. Macy accidentally kills their mother when she teleports home with a strong wave of power. She rewrites history again, this time in a world where she remains dead. Mel, Maggie, and Harry retain their memories, and have Marisol help them return to the moment when the Power of Three shattered. After much struggle, they convince Macy to give up her powers. The magical community, including Leon and Chloe, congratulate the Charmed Ones and wish for them to take over as the new Elders.

=== Season 2 (2019–2020) ===
No. overall	No. in season	Title	Directed by	Written by	Original release date	U.S. viewers (millions)
23	1	"Safe Space"	Stuart Gillard	Liz Kruger & Craig Shapiro	October 11, 2019	0.65
Maggie is partying, Macy is planning to take a job in Michigan and Mel is taking the Charmed Ones' new responsibilities seriously, learning that several Whitelighters have gone missing. A hooden assassin attacks the mansion, destroying the Book of Shadows, which creates a portal that the sisters jump through, although not before Macy has been shot in the leg and Harry stabbed. They find themselves without their powers in a building called SafeSpace Seattle and meet the residents, including amateur witch Katrina and medic/boxer Jordan. Responding to a red light in the room they arrived in, the sisters are transported to Vermont and find two witches killed by rat demons. When Macy uses her demon powers on one of them, Harry is finally able to trace them and heal Macy. It transpires the portal was an emergency escape to the Elders' Command Center, which monitors for witches in danger. However, all the Whitelighters except Harry died with the Elders: Harry revived in his old body after being killed by the assassin. The four of them decide to take over the Command Center to help witches in trouble, and discover their house has been transported with them and is cloaked nearby. Harry conceals the fact that the assassin was his double.
24	2	"Things To Do In Seattle When You're Dead"	Nick Gomez	Joey Falco	October 18, 2019	0.73
Macy discovers that Layla, the niece of the two witches they found dead, has gone missing, and clues suggest she was kidnapped by the leader of the demons they encountered, who is part of something called the Seventh Circle in Oregon. As the only ones with powers, Macy and Harry head there by road. Maggie discovers that none only are the sisters believed killed in a house fire but their father is dead as well. She goes to the funeral without telling Mel, but has to be rescued by her from the Dark Harry assassin, and realise he wasn't a good father. Macy infiltrates a demon gathering where a spokesman, Godric, reveals an unseen overlord is uniting the demon families in a war against witches. They try to sacrifice Layla but she is saved by a combination of Macy impersonating the overlord and Maggie and Mel causing confusion with a cloaking serum. However, this results in the overlord learning they are alive. Maggie takes a receptionist's job at SafeSpace to be close to the Command Center.
25	3	"Careful What You Witch For"	Gina Lamar	Nicki Renna	October 25, 2019	0.73
Maggie applies to be assistant manager in order to keep access to the Command Center but finds herself competing against Jordan and unable to risk background checks. She uses a spell to get the job but feels guilty when Jordan is unable to afford the gym rent. Mel and Harry enlist the help of Katrina to enter the astral plane and communicate with the sentinel of the Elders' book. They appear to get their powers back in exchange for Katrina being tortured but Mel realises this is an illusion. Instead of their powers, they are given a device for translating the book. However, Katrina sees the worms that tormented her in reality. Macy rescues a witch, Abigael, from the Overlords' minions and takes her to the Command Center, where she learns she is part-demon. The demon Callum arrives at SafeSpace following a tracking device and Abigael identifies him as the Overlord. Macy and Maggie lure him to the Command Center where Abigael kills him. Abigael then attacks Macy before revealing she also had an encounter with the assassin.
26	4	"Deconstructing Harry"	Ken Fink	Natalia Fernandez & Jeffrey Lieber	November 1, 2019	0.66
Harry and Macy learn that Abigael is the Overlord: She was uniting demons against them believing they sent the assassin after her. Maggie encourages Jordan to pitch for the gym to become part of a wellbeing initiative. She thinks she senses his feelings when she touches him, but actually gets a flash of a future comment he makes to his girlfriend, Lola. Harry follows papers in the command centre to a mental asylum in New York. There he finds Helen, the first Whitelighter, and an insane "sister" of hers, discovering this is a by-product of the process that creates Whitelighters. Mel, Macy and Abigael investigate the town where the assassin tried to take Abigael and find it is being prowled by dangerous magical creatures, Kyons. Abigael reveals she is Caine's daughter. Mel uses a tracking potion to find the Kyon queen; the Charmed Ones and Abigael discover the hunter is keeping the most powerful of magical species captive. Mel free them but in the confusion Macy is transported away by what they initially believe is Harry but is actually the assassin. Harry explains the assassin is his Darklighter named Jimmy.
27	5	"The Truth about Kat and Dogs"	Tessa Blake	Johanna Lee	November 8, 2019	0.58
Mel and Maggie attempt a banned tracking spell in order to find Macy, but their inability to work out what she desires summons a demon dog which attacks them. Meanwhile, Harry lets Abigael perform a demon mind meld on him, which causes him to see flashes of his human life, including the fact he had a secret second family, and leads him to the castle where he was turned into a Whitelighter and where the essences of the Darklighters have been imprisoned: The rest of them died with their other halves but someone freed his. Katrina, who has been talking to someone invisible, sends Mel a message from Marisol, which causes her and Maggie to realise Harry is what Macy desires. With this, they are able to complete the spell and get her co-ordinates. Both Abigael and Katrina disappear in the aftermath.
28	6	"When Sparks Fly"	Brandi Bradburn	Jessica O'Toole & Amy Rardin	November 15, 2019	0.66
Macy is being held prisoner by Jimmy in a simulacrum of the house, where he is posing as Harry in the hope they can get to know each other better. Maggie attempts to force a vision of Macy by touching Jordan again. Mel traps them in a lift to help and Maggie realises it is actually Jordan's ring, a family heirloom reported to be magical, that she needs to touch. She is able to lead Mel and Harry to a demon bar in New York where Harry is mistaken for his Darklighter. A cloaked Mel helps him win a game of poker against the head demon but gets found out and they have to resort to threats to get Macy's location. Maggie tries on Jordan's ring and has a vision of him dying. Harry orbs Mel and Macy to safety, then fights and apparently kills Jimmy, unaware he has actually revived in their grave.
29	7	"Past is Present"	PJ Pesce	Teleplay by : Natalia Fernandez & Blake Taylor; Story by : Blake Taylor	November 22, 2019	0.77
Mel learns Katrina has closed down her shop, believing she's having a breakdown, and is about to check herself into a clinic. Mel convinces her she is not having hallucinations but is a medium. Katrina decides to leave town anyway, putting Mel in charge of the shop. Maggie, Macy and Harry do a trace spell on Jordan and learn he was cursed by a dying witch. They follow an alert to dryad territory but find them massacred and fruit that makes one immune to magic stolen from a sacred tree. They confront Abigael, who reveals during her absence Godric unveiled Parker as the Overlord. Macy and Harry learn one of Jordan's ancestors was a witchfinder and a member of a coven he burnt condemned all the men from his family to die at twenty-five...the age Jordan is now. Maggie finds Parker is hoping to bring peace to the demons. Under truth serum, Abigael says she attacked the dryads and the tree died when touched. Maggie convinces Parker to strip her of her powers instead of executing her. Parker proposes to Maggie. In fact, Godric was behind the attack and used the fruit to protect Abigael from the truth serum and the power stripping: Having decided Parker is too soft, he intends to have Abigael replace him as Overlord.
30	8	"The Rules of Engagement"	Kelli Williams	Zoe Marshall	December 6, 2019	0.61
Maggie initially turns down Parker's proposal, but when she hears Layla's coven was attacked by demons, she decides to marry him that day to bring peace between demons and witches. Mel uses a curse to turn herself into a fly, and overhears Godric telling Parker about the apples and giving them to him. Maggie sends her away but Godric uses the apples to start an argument between Parker and Maggie, which ends with Parker overdosing on the apples and trying to force Maggie to perform a blood ritual that will make her obey him. Harry and Macy rescue her with help from Abigael. Mel finds black amber in the Command Center which gives her molecular manipulation powers and gives Maggie a vision of Parker killing Jordan. A battle at SafeSpace ends with Abigael stabbing Parker and apparently killing him. Macy, who admitted her sketch was of the Darklighter, sees Harry and Abigael kissing. Abigael secretly imprisons Parker in the dungeon and succeeds him as the Overlord, blaming his "death" on witches.
31	9	"Guess Who's Coming to SafeSpace Seattle"	Michael Goi	Carolyn Townsend	January 17, 2020	0.65
Maggie has a vision of someone being killed by the Darklighter in a motel room. She, Mel and Harry investigate a New Jersey motel and run into the girls' father, Ray, who faked his own death. He admits he is a dealer in stolen ancient relics and someone has been after him since he sold a talisman he took from Marisol's attic. They are forced to take him to the house and explain about magic. Macy fills in for Maggie at SafeSpace and learns the new owner, billionaire philanthropist Julian Shea, is planning to excavate the area where the command centre is to build a hydroponics garden. She considers using magic to change his mind but ends up delaying the project by getting him to order a study on the impact on fauna. A Minoan artifact Ray stole contains a stone that uncloaks the house. Harry and Mel learn the stone's guardian is after it. Ray stops the guardian killing Maggie by giving it the stone. Jordan researches Maggie and learns she is believed dead. He almost sees her disappear into the Command Center.
32	10	"Curse Words"	Doug Aarniokoski	Aziza Aba Butain & Joey Falco	January 24, 2020	0.59
It is hours until Jordan turns 26, but when Maggie has to save him from a falling girder, she realises she has to keep an eye on him until then. The ghost of the witch his ancestor killed, Florence, possesses Swan to try and kill him and Maggie has to take Jordan to the Command Center and explain about magic. Florence is appeased by Maggie returning her ring and a crossing spell from the Charmed Ones, although she warns Jordan needs to balance the scales in order to break the curse fully. Abigael asks Harry to heal her after being poisoned but Macy realises she faked the attempt to spend time with Harry and had the antidote to hand. Harry decides to continue seeing her anyway. Mel gets Ray to contact Nadia, the buyer who bought the talisman, but when she sees through Mel's attempt to plant a tracking device on her, Ray gives her some black amber. Ray decides to go into hiding again to protect the girls as Nadia begins experimenting with the sample.
33	11	"Dance Like No One is Witching"	Michael A. Allowitz	Christina Piña & Nicki Renna	January 31, 2020	0.62
Julian tells Macy about his parents dying in a car crash when he was young and they sleep together. Next morning, Macy meets his aunt Vivienne Laurent, who is working on the Airmid, a rapid DNA sequencer. Harry is injured when he and Mel battle a demon. Abigael thinks he was infected with a parasite and has the antidote, but if she's wrong it will kill him. Macy breaks up with Julian in exchange for Vivienne giving her access to the Airmid to analyse Harry's blood. Maggie and Jordan use Nadia's number plate to track down an associate of hers, Bruce, and offer to sell her the chakram. At Nadia's club, a shaman begins using the black amber and life force drained from the patrons to resurrect someone. After Mel and Macy go to help Maggie, Abigael administers the antidote without waiting for the analysis, saving Harry. The Charmed Ones save Jordan but the resurrection is partly successful. Julian refuses to accept Macy breaking up with him.
34	12	"Needs to Know"	Jeff Byrd	Johanna Lee & Jessica O'Toole & Amy Rardin	February 7, 2020	0.57
An attempt to recreate the Power of Three fails and Macy appears to be the problem. Macy goes to Abigael with help stripping her of her demon powers, which she thinks are blocking her witch powers. Harry receives a message from Helen: Someone attacked the institute and her Darklighter has gone missing. Macy learns Parker is alive and he agrees to hand over the dagger needed for the power stripping in return for her giving a message to Maggie. Macy goes through with the ceremony. Maggie and Harry track down Dark Helen and Maggie manages to win her trust. The Charmed Ones try to merge the two Helens but Dark Helen attacks Macy, mistaking her for an Elder. Helen stabs herself, killing them both. Mel arranges a date with bartender Ruby, and Macy decides not to pass on Parker's message but black amber still fails to restore her witch powers. Parker learns Abigael now has Macy's powers.
35	13	"Breaking the Cycle"	Joseph E. Gallagher	Blake Taylor	February 21, 2020	0.60
Harry receives a telepathic message from the Darklighter inviting him to Foster Island, Maine. He takes Abigael with him, asking her to help him contain the Darklighter again, and if they fail to kill him in order to kill the Darklighter as well. However, they instead find everyone in the town frozen by a witch girl, Cassie, who was attacked by the witch hunters who were after Helen. Abigael kills the hunters when reinforcements arrive and Harry helps Cassie unfreeze the town. The Charmed Ones set off a security protocol in the command centre that requires them to speak the unspoken. Mel confesses her relationship with Ruby and Macy about Parker being alive, before they admit truths about themselves. A Guardian warns them that the Power of Three has killed one of each trio of sisters that wielded it. Macy chooses to restore her powers anyway in the hope they can break the cycle. The Darklighter tells Harry the hunters are controlling him with the talisman and asks him to free him.
36	14	"Sudden Death"	Stacey N. Harding	Tommy Cook & Jeffrey Lieber	February 28, 2020	0.62
Harry gets a telepathic cry for help from the Darklighter. He and Mel check out the factory where the magical creatures were imprisoned and discover a group of scientists imbued something with a combination of magical abilities. They trace the group's facility and find the Darklighter imprisoned in his glass again, and the creature the experiment created, who was based on the corpse the Charmed Ones saw resurrected. Maggie is convinced Abigael is blocking the Power of Three and enlists Jordan's help to sneak into her mansion. There, she encounters the caged Parker and learns her theory is wrong. Macy tries to find a way to sever the link between the Harrys that will cause one to die with the others. She fails, but a comment by Julian causes her to realise there is a way to merge them. Vivienne turns out to be behind the witch hunters.
37	15	"Third Time's The Charm"	Stuart Gillard	Carolyn Townsend	March 27, 2020	0.60
Answering an alert in Portland, the Charmed Ones find Bruce, who unleashes another magically empowered creature on them. When Maggie smashes Bruce's control device, the creature kills him and disappears. The Charmed Ones find Celeste, a former Elder who created Whitelighters, and take her back to the Command Center. She insists they need the Power of Three and, when they show reluctance, places them in dreams to face their fears. However, their worst fear is losing each other, meaning they don't die and wake up. Macy sees a scenario where she left, Abigael replaced her in the Power of Three and is married to Harry with children, and accidentally kills Maggie while fighting Abigael. Maggie is unable to convince her sisters or Jordan to believe her about the monster coming and it kills Mel. Mel finds herself in a lunatic asylum with Jordan as Witchfinder General Lawrence Mortimer Chase about to burn her sisters. Harry joins them in the dream and he, Mel and Maggie sacrifice themselves to protect Macy, the only one who hasn't died, resulting in them waking up. Mel, Macy and Maggie return to Portland, where the creature has killed another witch, and decide to stop being afraid, restoring the Power of Three and using it to destroy the creature.
38	16	"The Enemy of My Frenemy"	Felix Alcala	Bianca Sams	April 3, 2020	0.57
Harry and Macy deduce that the Faction have been using bodies donated to medical research as vessels for their magic creatures. The Charmed Ones rescue a witch from a group of Carnal demons and kill them in self-defence, but one turns out to be the clan leader, Alfie. Abigael tries to install a female clan member, Lee, as the new leader but Godric decides to depose her and replace her with Parker. However, when he discovers the Charmed Ones are in danger as well, Parker teleports Macy and Maggie to safety. Godric tries to execute Abigael and Mel to declare himself new Overlord but Parker, Maggie and Macy save them. Parker has Abigael strip him of his powers. Macy is reluctant to commit to Julian. Harry has Jordan pose as a corpse to infiltrate the Faction facility. He is mistaken for his Darklighter by Nadia, who was involved with him, and taken from the facility by her.
39	17	"Search Party"	Craig Shapiro	Aziza Aba Butain & Nicki Renna	April 10, 2020	0.71
Macy is preparing to break up with Julian, but when Maggie and Mel retrieve Jordan and hear his story, they learn the car Harry left in belonged to Julian's company. Maggie has a vision suggesting Harry is a prisoner in the basement so it is decided that she, Macy and Jordan will attend a charity gala there, with Abigael recruited to help Mel provide them with potions as back-up. Maggie realises from her vision that Vivienne is involved. Julian tells Macy that his sister Rosemary was lying injured in the road after the crash that killed their parents, and he saw a man (obviously a Whitelighter) heal the women in the other car and vanish with them. Macy, Maggie and Jordan find Harry in a cryogenic pod set to transfer his magic to a test subject, killing him in the process, and manage to transport the pod back to the Command Center. When Harry comes round, Macy admits her feelings only to find he doesn't remember her.
40	18	"Don't Look Back in Anger"	Rupert E.C. Evans	Joey Falco & Zoe Marshall	April 17, 2020	0.62
Harry has lost all memory of his time as a Whitelighter. Macy attempts a spell to restore his memories but it backfires and instead she remembers accidentally triggering her powers in college and burning a classmate who sexually harassed her. Her father summoned Marisol to council her from out of view and Harry erased her memory of the trauma. Jordan realises Harry has a magic blocker implanted in him and removes it, allowing him to heal Macy of the damage from a seizure. Mel is contacted by Ray, who has been researching the Faction. The secrets people are keeping from her causes Maggie to have a reoccurrence of her teenage panic attacks. Mel, Maggie and Ray infiltrate a Faction facility at an abandoned military base and discover an army of creatures in suspended animation. They find Julian in charge and he recognises Maggie before they portal out. Macy and Harry dance and kiss.
41	19	"Unsafe Space"	Joseph E. Gallagher	Jessica O'Toole & Amy Rardin & Christina Piña	May 1, 2020	0.58
Julian has shut down SafeSpace Seattle, installing magic detectors and trying to drill his way into the Command Center. Harry thinks the Darklighter is their best lead and summons Celeste to help free him. She has a key at the castle where Whitelighters were created which can open the bottle and takes Harry to collect it. Mel, Macy and Maggie are sent to a gathering of retired witches to retrieve a marble that can get them into the Command Center and find Ruby there. She gives them her marble, but attempting to use it without her leaves Maggie and Macy trapped in the marble with limited air supply. Ruby joins Harry, Mel and Celeste in getting them out and together they release and contain the Darklighter, but he nearly escapes after Harry leaves his spot when Macy is injured, causing him to doubt the wisdom of their relationship. Ruby tells Mel she still wants nothing to do with witchcraft. Vivienne encourages Julian to go after the Charmed Ones, since the Command Center is magically protected. On learning black amber can temporarily revive Rosemary from her vegetative state, he agrees.

=== Season 3 (2021) ===
No. overall	No. in season	Title	Directed by	Written by	Original release date	U.S. viewers (millions)
42	1	"An Inconvenient Truth"	Stuart Gillard	Natalia Fernandez	January 24, 2021	0.46
Julian post a video online naming Macy as missing and offering a substantial reward for anyone who can find her. Macy and Mel come up with a plan to give Julian a potion which will convince him and anyone he comes into contact with that magic doesn't exist, ending the Faction. Florence gives Jordan a limited amount of time to save a descendant of the witches his ancestor killed. He goes to Abigael who helps him save Eleanor, a witch trapped in a painting, then asks him to help contact her sister. Macy and Harry go to a magic market for potion ingredients. Maggie accidentally induces various moods in Mel. Jimmy provides the location of Rosemary, allowing Harry to abduct Julian. Macy convinces him to help them by finding evidence that Vivienne faked Rosemary's apparent recovery with medication to keep him on her side. The potion is instead given to Jimmy, keyed to make him and everyone else see him as a good man, and he is set loose for a fresh start.
43	2	"Someone's Going to Die"	Menhaj Huda	Jeffrey Lieber & Carrie Williams	January 31, 2021	0.42
Maggie has a vision of several of their friends in danger and announces someone will die today. The black amber tree can be sealed off but the guardian warns it will destroy the Command Center. Julian has been sent back to the compound disguised as Nadia, the real Nadia having had her memory of the Faction erased and dumped elsewhere. Vivienne has developed a prism that can absorb and wield magic. The Charmed Ones shut down a magical field protecting the compound so Harry can orb in and he discovers Vivienne has killed and absorbed all the magical creatures. Macy joins him as Julian reveals who he is and tries to shut down the project. Vivienne kills him and reads Macy's memories. She attacks the Command Center and absorbs the black amber but trying to absorb the Power of Three overloads and kills her. Ruby shows the first signs of a condition affecting all witches and demons: Vivienne touching the black amber has poisoned magic.
44	3	"Triage"	PJ Pesce	Liz Kruger & Craig Shapiro	February 14, 2021	0.37
The guardian indicates that only the Source can restore the tree and it will require a great sacrifice. Abigarl helps the Charmed Ones remember clues as to where they left the Source segments. Celeste helps Melanie and Abigael travel to Marisol's grave in the future and see a grave indicating Melanie dies that day. Jordan and Maggie check out Maggie's old sorority house before Maggie realises she added a magical compartment to her jewellery box. Macy and Harry go to Desolation Island. Jimmy recovers his memories as magic fades and attacks Harry since they are no longer bonded but Harry kills him. Melanie tries to use the Source alone to restore the tree but the others join her. They all survive but are left unable to touch each other. Abigael receives a package from her sister with a note saying to never contact her again. It contains a totem which increases her power.
45	4	"You Can't Touch This"	Bola Ogun	Joey Falco & Geraldine Elizabeth Inoa	February 21, 2021	0.30
Three months later, the Charmed Ones are living with not being able to touch or approach each other or any other magical being. Macy is searching for a cure, while Maggie and Mel are attending Seattle State College as a student and teacher respectively and Jordan is working for a law firm. Maggie struggles to make an impression on her professor, Doctor Lawrence, who favours fellow student Antonio. Mel tries to champion the cause of transsexual student Kevin, who is bullied by his dorm mate. Harry finds a tablet with strange symbols on it behind a wall in the Command Centre. A strange force possesses the Charmed Ones at night and forces them to perform a ritual. Harry disappears and, while rescuing him, the sisters fight and kill a strange creature. The tablet suggests what they're dealing with is thousands of years old.
46	5	"Yew Do You"	James Genn	Johanna Lee & Christina Piña	February 28, 2021	0.34
Macy finds Julian has left her Safe Space. Jordan and Harry travel to Norway to investigate inscriptions relating to the creature the Charmed Ones encountered. Mel fights to introduce a book about transgender experience to her class when Dean Rebecca Eldon tries to replace it with an old book of hers. A young woman, Julie, runs over her boyfriend after an encounter with a stranger, sparking similar cases of people hurting their loved ones. Macy and Maggie find Julie and get her to the Command Centre. She helps the Charmed Ones and Harry work out they are dealing with Oman, a mythical being who feeds off others' devotion and forces them to sacrifice their loved ones to prove their love. The Charmed Ones confront Oman who is destroyed when he is entranced by his own reflection. The experiences inspires Maggie to focus on movement therapy for her internship application.
47	6	"Private Enemy No. 1"	James Genn	Aziza Aba Butain & Nicki Renna	March 14, 2021	0.40
Macy and Harry look into conspiracy theorist Elliot and find he has a magical orb which they steal. Harry begins showing obsessive behaviour after being exposed to it and Elliot dies from the addiction. Macy is able to convince Harry to give it up. Maggie believes Antonio sabotaged her attempt at a volunteer study and does the same to him, only to learn it was a frat prank. Jordan has to represent a company denying a claim for a workplace injury. Mel is jealous of Ruby's friend Bella. Abigael asks Mel's help with a spirit that's attacking her in her sleep. Mel learns Abigael actually turns into a demon when she's asleep. Abigael admits the totem contained her demon side which her mother extracted from her. Harry and Macy work out that using the Source to restore the tree opened a magic prison and the world has been flooded with ancient evil creatures.
48	7	"Witch Way Out"	Menhaj Huda	Natalia Fernandez & Carolyn Townsend	March 21, 2021	0.32
Mel, Maggie and Macy find themselves in an otherwise deserted realm resembling their home, the Command Centre and Safe Space. They lose memories if left alone, but noticing details that are wrong causes them to view their most recent memories, including Macy being refused permission by the Safe Space board to set up a free legal clinic and Mel sounding off about Dean Eldon in public. They realise they are in the monster prison, which they dub the Tomb of Chaos. Repeating the spell that got them there fails to get them home but they manage to escape through the same rift the monsters are using. Macy finds a way to open the clinic and Dean Eldon is placed on indefinite leave for auditing Mel's class without permission. Jordan runs into the house being chased by something.
49	8	"O, The Tangled Web"	Geary McLeod	Sidney Quashie & Bianca Sams	March 28, 2021	0.33
Macy is called to a board meeting at the Shea Group but is escorted out by security. Harry and Mel go looking for the other half of the stone tablet and find an injured witch, Kyra, who has been poisoned. She says she was attacked by a demon named Willow. Maggie and a stressed Macy go after Willow but find she is also a witch. Mel attacks Abigael for breaking the truce until Harry explains the situation. Kyra's family left Willow's coven and she was trying to bury her mother's ashes in the traditional burial ground. Mel negotiates between the pair and she and Harry find the other half of the tablet. Macy reveals she was actually there to front a photoshoot highlighting fighting malaria in Africa and the PR representative, Laurie, accused her of threatening her when she objected. Abigael convinces Jordan to let her read his memories of retrieving the totem, thinking her sister cursed it, but realises she is doing it to herself.
50	9	"No Hablo Brujeria"	Rupert E.C. Evans	Geraldine Elizabeth Inoa & Jeffrey Lieber	April 11, 2021	0.34
Macy and Jordan are attacked by a mysterious hooded figure and trapped in a realm based on Jordan's memories. Maggie and Mel find the figure is their second cousin from Puerto Rico, Josefina Reyes, whose family told her she couldn't be a witch after transitioning and who has decided to retrieve the Book of Shadows to prove herself. Jordan's curse has made the spell unstable and they will die if they don't get out. Jordan goes through encounters with the high school girlfriend who cheated on him, an Afghan translator who was killed on a mission and his Witchfinder General ancestor. He protects Florence from him but refuses to kill him, leading Florence to release him from his curse. Harry and Abigael track down Fenric, a violent ancient demon who can help translate the tablet. He has used an amulet to repress his emotions and uses it on them, trying to get Harry to kill Abigael so he can replace her as Overlord. Harry refuses, concluding demons with logic but no emotions would be even more dangerous, and they leave with the translation. Harry and Macy translate the tablet but cause it to start raining scorpions.
51	10	"Bruja-Ha"	Joseph E. Gallagher	Joey Falco & Blake Taylor	April 18, 2021	0.43
Six days later, the Charmed Ones are exhausted from tracking down the monsters emerging from the rift. Maggie is using her powers to starve off fear but this leaves her magically exhausted during an encounter with a doppelganger, which Mel has to help her with. While vanquishing a faceless monster, Mel encounters a mysterious man and woman who follow her back to the Command Centre and strip Harry of his powers temporarily. Mel imprisons them with a binding spell Josefina invented but Josefina lets them out, convinced they can give her powers. While they can't, they do vanquish a monster Macy accidentally brought back and introduce themselves as Mo and Aladria, the Perfecti, who brought order to the magic world in ancient times and created the Tomb of Chaos. They seal the rift before transporting Mel, Maggie and Macy away with a promise of curing their allergy.
52	11	"Witchful Thinking"	Ken Fink	Natalia Fernandez & Johanna Lee	May 7, 2021	0.36
The Charmed Ones retrieve an egg that reverses their allergy. Mel is given a permanent position, Maggie gets the internship and Harry and Macy enjoy a romantic break in Paris. However, it becomes clear their luck is at the expense of others: Two more senior professors are passed over, Antonio is critically injured in a car accident and an old man has a heart attack so Macy and Harry can have his suite. The sisters decide to return the egg even though it will reverse all their good luck. Josefina manifests her powers and worries this will be reversed too but she keeps them and decides to return to Puerto Rico. Harry considers being mortal. Abigael asks Jordan to help bind her demon powers permanently but she disappears in the middle of the ritual while Jordan is trapped in the Tomb of Chaos.
53	12	"Spectral Healing"	Jacquie Gould	Tommy Cook & Nicki Renna	May 14, 2021	0.40
Macy finds some letters Marisol left behind, one of which suggests she knew about the allergy. Macy and Maggie perform a spell to summon Marisol's spirit but instead Maggie is possessed by Roger and Daisy, a father and daughter who owned Marisol's letter box, who died in a car crash after he stopped her going to prom. Daisy forgiving Roger releases him and she finds peace after a dance with Antonio. Marisol visits but knows nothing. Harry learns he can become mortal with a soul donation from a descendant. He and Mel go to England but find his son Carter has recently died. Carter's secret son Georgie eats part of the spell and his soul is detached until Harry helps him through his grief. Maggie realises Abigael and Jordan are in the Tomb of Chaos, where Abigael is being tormented by visions of her abusive mother Francesca.
54	13	"Chaos Theory"	Ken Fink	Aziza Aba Butain & Sidney Quashie	May 21, 2021	0.36
The Charmed Ones confront the Perfecti, who determine that since Jordan helped Abigael, he can only be released if the Charmed Ones prove she is innocent. Maggie tries to help Jordan hold on to his memories, while Mel and Macy find Abigael resigned to her fate and unwilling to defend herself. Forcing her to testify to her good intentions under truth serum and exposing Francesca's abuse of her do little to sway the tribunal and the Perfecti ultimately conclude the Charmed Ones are chaotic themselves and try to imprison them. The sisters fight back, freeing Jordan and Abby. Jordan decides to go away for a while. The Perfecti conclude the Charmed Ones must be destroyed.
55	14	"Perfecti Is the Enemy of Good"	Joseph E. Gallagher	Christina Piña & Carolyn Townsend	June 11, 2021	0.39
Mo and Aladria attack Mel, infecting her with a magical illness which will kill her by midnight if the sisters don't agree to go into the Tomb. Mel is placed into a magically induced coma. Celeste has been helping strip Harry of his immortality and they return to help Maggie and Macy. Viewing the memory mirror suggests ancient Charmed Ones defeated the Perfecti with a golem. Since a demon password is needed to activate it, Maggie impersonates Abigael in order to get the word from Fenric. However, a paranoid Harry works out the memory is a fake and the Perfecti will control the golem. Macy, Maggie, Harry and Celeste manage to trick the Perfecti into opening the Tomb, then get the bloodstone that controls the golem and have it force Mo and Aladria into the Tomb of Chaos. Mel reveals that she was contacted by her future self during the coma and is now pregnant with her future baby in order to protect it.
56	15	"Schrodinger's Future"	Stuart Gillard	Bianca Sams & Blake Taylor	June 18, 2021	0.41
Maggie has a nightmarish vision of the future and Celeste sends her and Macy five years into the future to investigate. Harry regresses to childhood as a result of his young soul. The future is devastated and deserted. A future version of Abigael explains that something called the Whispering Evil infected and controlled people. Maggie is dead and Mel disappeared while investigating it. They are attacked by the infected future version of Macy, who kills Abigael and damages the time watch. Harry hides one in a nearby mall for them to retrieve in the future. Ruby helps Mel brew up potions to let them transition back to the present, after which they find they can touch again, possibly as a result of Mel's pregnancy. Macy and Maggie bring future Mel's research back with them, which indicates they have three weeks to prevent the disaster.
57	16	"What to Expect When You're Expecting the Apocalypse"	Joseph E. Gallagher	Joey Falco & Carrie Williams	June 25, 2021	0.36
Abigael tracks down her sister Waverley in the hope of retrieving a blade she needs to return Macy's demon powers. When they are attacked by a demon bounty hunter, they go to Mel for shelter. Waverley deliberately lures the demon to them and learns Francesca sent him to retrieve her daughter. She agrees to help Abigael. Macy and Maggie take a potion made from Mel's foetus in the hope of ending the allergy and realise the Whispering Evil is an escapee from the Tomb of Chaos. Swan and several others are infected at Safe Space and suspicion falls on Jordan, Antonio and Harry. Maggie overdoses Antonio on truth serum learning he's innocent while Harry is avoiding dreams of his human death but eventually learns he died saving a little girl from being run over. Jordan turns out to have been possessed by the Whispering Evil while he was in the Tomb. Macy and Maggie get over the allergy in time to contain those infected but Jordan remains at large.
58	17	"The Storm Before the Calm"	Geoff Shotz	Jeffrey Lieber & Sidney Quashie	July 16, 2021	0.42
Mel, Macy and Maggie visit Aladria who says the Whispering Evil can be separated from Jordan and destroyed but it will need an attack it's never faced before, like combining Macy's demon powers with the Power of Three. Mel goes into labour and Josefina is recruited to slow it down. Macy and Abigael go to retrieve the blade but are confronted by Francesca, who tries to kill Abigael. She is stopped by Waverley and forced to let them use the blade. Maggie and Harry go to stop Jordan infecting the water supply and Maggie is infected. Mel has to let her labour start again to use the Power of Three and the Whispering Evil is forced out of Jordan, frozen and shattered. All the infected recover. Abigael leaves to get to know Waverley and her daughter. Mel realises there was no vanquishing symbol and Aladria confirms the Whispering Evil has survived and is looking for a new host to start again.
59	18	"I Dreamed a Dream..."	Stuart Gillard	Liz Kruger & Craig Shapiro	July 23, 2021	0.43
Macy goes on her own to collect a lichen that can poison the Whispering Evil, only for it to attack and possess her. She swallows the lichen and kills it but is severely injured in the process. Mel and Maggie enter her mind in a lifeline spell, experiencing things they never got to, like a fairground, a sky jump, a picnic, a road trip and her wedding to Harry. Harry asks Celeste to make him a Whitelighter again so he can heal her. To this end, Jordan kills him with a magic poison and revives him with a defibrilator. He manages to revive Macy but she knows she is too badly injured. Mel and Maggie help her to the chamber where she joins with the Guardian. Future Mel returns to transfer the baby back. Unnoticed, Jordan seems to heal Maggie's cut. The Guardian informs them there is another out there.

=== Season 4 (2022) ===
No. overall	No. in season	Title	Directed by	Written by	Original release date	U.S. viewers (millions)
60	1	"Not That Girl"	Kevin Dowling	Aziza Aba Butain & Jeffrey Leiber	March 11, 2022	0.40
6 months after Macy's death, Kaela Danso and her friends celebrate her five years in remission. She tells her best friend about the dreams she had been having involving two girls over the last six months. Maggie and Jordan hunt demons, while Mel is having sex at a bar called the Blue Camellia. Maggie prepares to go demon-hunting and goes to Philadelphia where Mel also unexpectedly arrives. They find Kaela, but the ball in her painting comes to life, creates a portal, and sends her to the Command Center. Maggie and Mel return to Seattle and all three try to cast the Power of Three, but it fails to work. In the Command Center they find out that Kaela's painting came to life, the apple Josefina ate and turned her to paper. It also created a negative space monster that they are able to defeat with help from the Blue Camellia's owner, Roxie. Kaela believes in magic, allowing the Power of Three to work. They also find her birth certificate from Harry, meaning her birth parents could be anyone. Mel and Maggie give her the choice to choose between a regular life or magical life. Kaela returns to Philadelphia.
61	2	"You Can't Go Home Again"	Liz Kruger	Liz Kruger & Blake Taylor	March 18, 2022	0.45
Kaela tries to hide her powers when her art starts manifesting several times. A vittra, an old lady who kills anyone who shows their magic to humans, is hunting Kaela. Jordan and Harry team up so they can figure out where coins are coming that Jordan found, and Chloe told him about how it might a villain named The Tallyman. Meanwhile, Maggie and Mel find Kaela, but she dosne't want to go back to Seattle, but she's in trouble. They find that the vittra is in the building that Kaela is having a party at. After the party ends, the vittra arrives to kill Kaela, but is stopped by Maggie and Mel. Kaela decides to join the Charmed Ones afterwards. The Tallyman arrives at a cabin the Charmed Ones were in.
62	3	"Unlucky Charmed"	Stuart Gillard	Nicki Renna	March 25, 2022	0.30
Mel is haunted by visions of her breakup with Ruby. Jordan gets angry with Maggie for hunting demons on her own and being more violent later, causing Maggie to get furious, causing Jordan to hit pause on their relationship. Kaela finds an egg in the house, then she later gets attacked by an animal, later getting put in a coccoon. Mel, Jordan, and Maggie later find her in the coccoon and free her, but Maggie, believing the monster (lamia) almost killed Kaela, goes to kill the lamia. Mel stops her by revealing why Ruby broke up with her. She says that she proposed to Ruby one month after Macy died, but she turned her down. Later, Maggie attempts to contact Dr. Choy, but is harassed by a guy, causing her to punch him on a street.
63	4	"Ripples"	Joseph E. Gallagher	Tommy Cook & Carolyn Townsend	April 1, 2022	0.36
Maggie is arrested for beating up a guy on a public street. The next morning, Mel tries to time-freeze a clock, but it ends up disappearing. Maggie later comes back home and Mel comforts her, but the Tallyman is watching the whole thing. Mel puts Kaela in charge of the Command Center while she and Maggie go on a vacation away from everything. Kaela accidentally destroys the conch Mel gave her, and goes to the Blue Camellia to get it fixed, but no one helps. A new character named Dev helps Kaela fix the conch and help her control her abilities better. She finds Mel and Maggie at the spa and the Tallyman had poisoned the water lily, so they need bath bombs, but is not in their reach. Kaela manifests bath bombs then her and Maggie cast the purification incantation to stop the water lily from shooting thorns. The clock later reappears, revealing that she can send objects back in time. Later, the Tallyman ruins the Charmed Ones' reputation by saying they are responsible for all the deaths happening.
64	5	"The Sisterhood of the Traveling Sandwich"	Rupert E.C. Evans	Joey Falco	April 8, 2022	0.36
Mel sends a turkey sandwich back in time with her new time traveling power. A terrorist hobgoblin named Donnie threatens everyone at The Blue Camellia for the lives of the Charmed Ones. Mel sends Kaela and Maggie back in time to make sure he never came in the first place, but ends up sending them to 1926. Maggie and Kaela try to figure out a way out of the past. In present day 2022, Mel and Roxie try to stop Donnie, but Roxie ends up getting shot by Sunny, who is working with him. Maggie manages to alarm Mel, allowing her to bring them to the present and using Egyptian Nightshade defeat Donnie and Sunny. Mel, Kaela, Maggie use the Filtration Frame to find who Kaela's birth parents are, only to reveal she is not their sister.
65	6	"The Tallyman Cometh"	Keesha Sharp	Sidney Quashie	April 15, 2022	0.31
Maggie has to do anger management with her dad after she punched a guy on a street, and a package arrives on the Charmed Ones house doorstep. Mel and Kaela turn to Dev to help them, but rejects it after learning about the death they caused. At the Command Center, Maggie gets a vision of the Faction's 1 year defeat anniversary in New York. When Maggie, Mel, and Kaela arrive they find spiders everywhere and they also find the Tallyman. While Kaela talks to Dev, Maggie and Mel go after the Tallyman. When is plan fails, he decides to commit suicide. Dev arrives at the Vera Manor, apologizes to Kaela and they make out. Ray tells Jordan not to tell Maggie and Mel that he is cursed.
66	7	"Cats and Camels and Elephants, Oh My..."	Jem Garrard	Jeffery Lieber & Christina Piña	April 29, 2022	0.33
Harry explains he gave up his Whitelighter powers to try and find Macy in the Veil, the world of the dead. Maggie has a vision of Sunny resurrecting an unknown monster in 17 hours, when the Pink Moon reaches its zenith. Kaela introduces Dev to her mother, only to realize that she is an imposter and poisoned Dev. She uses the full disclosure potion on her, only to reveal that it is Sunny. She then cuts her thumb off for the resurrection ritual. Mel finds out that Sunny needed a sample of her blood, Maggie's hair, and Kaela's thumb for the ritual. Mel, Maggie and Kaela go to Iran to stop Sunny. Mel and Kaela try to stop the ritual while Maggie kills Sunny with her new power of Empathic Mimicry. Kaela tells Dev they can date when the time is right. Sunny wakes up with five lives left and promises to bring the Lost One back, the monster she was trying to resurrect. Meanwhile, Mel finds out that Ray is cursed with the Unity Bowl from Jordan.
67	8	"Unveiled"	Jackeline Tejeda	Bianca Sams	May 6, 2022	0.35
The Provenance Spell on Kaela's baby blanket reveals her birth parents are in Georgia. The Unseen have developed a hit list of everyone who has helped the Charmed Ones. Mel uses her time-traveling powers to get the OG Book of Shadows for Blindaje Dolls to protect them as well for a protection spell around the house. Mel and Ruby go to Roxie so she can help them defeat Earl who has been her mother and hunting Ruby since she was 18. Maggie and Kaela visit her birth parents, who tell Kaela why they gave her up. After being in the Veil with Harry, Dexter wakes up in the attic.
68	9	"Truth or Cares"	Eduardo Sánchez	Carolyn Townsend	May 13, 2022	0.34
Maggie finds out from Jordan that Ray is cursed. She, Ray, and Jordan find Dexter in the attic. Mel, Kaela, and Dev are on lookout outside of a church as five Unseen members have gone inside.They also find out that Sunny is back, so Mel and Kaela decide to go in and find her. Mel finds Sunny and fights her, but the church collapses and Dev is able to get Kaela out, but the church shrinks into a snow globe. Dexter tells Maggie he died of the Unity Bowl's curse. Ray and Dexter fight, causing an essence of wolf's bane to spill on Maggie's stuffed animal Trunksie, bringing it to life. Later, Trunksie is trying to kill Ray and Jordan, but Maggie casts a spell that sends Dexter back to the Veil and Trunksie to the toy chest. Kaela smashes the snow globe, freeing Mel and Sunny, but sends her to Turkey. Ray drinks from the Unity Bowl, healing his curse. Jordan smashes the bowl, sending a spell in the OG Book of Shadows.
69	10	"Hashing it Out"	Joseph E. Gallagher	Carrie Williams	May 20, 2022	0.30
Each of the Charmed Ones are navigating their love lives. Meanwhile, the Unseen arrive at The Command Center looking for the Unity Bowl. Mel and Maggie arrive later at The Command Center and are both shot by one of the Unseen members, temporarily cutting off their powers. When they try to escape, the exit is blocked by a containment spell. Mel is able to send a call to Kaela so she can come, but the line is cut off by Sunny before she can finish the call. Kaela and Dev are able to arrive at SafeSpace just in time to save Maggie and Jordan. Sunny tells Maggie to give her the Unity Bowl, or she will kill Mel. Dev is able to knock out the Unseen member blocking Mel and Maggie's powers and they are able to defeat the Unseen. Kaela kills Sunny by drawing lives using Dev's blood. She finds out that Sunny killed Dev and finds a gift from him saying her name, causing her to break down, and Maggie and Mel comfort her.
70	11	"Divine Secrets of the O.G. Sisterhood"	Paul Wu	Joey Falco & Ivy Malone	May 27, 2022	0.31
The Unseen use the OG Book of Shadows to create a new Unity Bowl. At Dev's funeral, Kaela decides to give her responsibilities as a Charmed One after Mel mentions the Unseen. Kaela exploits the fact that they aren't even biological sisters and then leaves. While leaving, Kaela meets one of the first Charmed Ones, Ishani, who convinces her to go back to Mel and Maggie, but also reveals the Lost One is her sister, Inara. Maggie uses a flipside spell (memory viewing spell) to view memories of Chloe's sister, Daphne. Mel, Maggie and Kaela arrive where the Unseen are, where they transferring their powers to the Lost One to resurrect her. Inara comes back and tell them that she doesn't wants to fight, but end a war. As the Charmed Ones try to use the Power of Three, Inara drinks the liquid from the bowl, allowing her to reclaim the Power of Three. As they try to fight her, Inara smashes the Unity Bowl on the ground, engulfing Mel, Maggie, and Kaela in a blue light.
71	12	"Be Kind. Rewind."	Stuart Gillard	Blake Taylor	June 3, 2022	0.36
Mel, Maggie, and Kaela wake up in a paradise world where everyone is brainwashed. Kaela is able to break free when she finds Dev's gift. Harry tells her that Inara used a spell to recreate the world and must free Mel and Maggie. After freeing them, they also discover Inara turned all the humans into trees and took all of the Charmed Ones' magical items. Mel tells Maggie and Kaela they can get the Power of Three back by drinking Black Amber in the Command Center. However, they need to get a sample of Inara's blood to get into the Command Center. Maggie frees Jordan from Inara's spell while Mel and Kaela make the other ingredients. Inara finds out about Jordan being freed and kills him. Mel, Maggie and Kaela drink the Black Amber, and get their powers back. Inara finds them and kills Mel and Harry. Maggie mimics Mel's powers before she dies. Maggie and Kaela are able to escape to their house before Inara arrives. Maggie uses Mel's time-traveling powers to send a tape back in time called: " Save The World" before Inara kills both of them. The tape gets send back in time at the house, when Dev's funeral is taking place, and Josefina, already at the house, finds the tape.
72	13	"The End is Never the End"	Kevin Dowling	Jeffery Lieber & Nicki Renna	June 10, 2022	0.39
After Kaela had left the funeral, Josefina arrives and shows Maggie and Mel the tape prompting them to change the future. Mel stops Kaela from meeting Ishani, while Maggie meets up with Jordan she then finds and brings Ishani's sister Ishta back to the Command Center as Mel brings Ishani and Kaela. The Charmed Ones then steal back the OG Books of Shadows from the Unseen. Meanwhile, Inara senses a change in the timeline. Maggie, Mel and Kaela summon Inara so Ishani and Ishta can reason with her, but Inara has a bomb that can destroy all magic, so the present Charmed Ones take the hit, but the past Charmed Ones decides to sacrifice themselves to save the world. 2 months later, Mel has taken over Blue Camellia after Roxie left, and Maggie is preparing to move out of the house. The series ends with Mel, Maggie and Kaela going to Halliwell Manor.

== Ratings ==
Charmed (2018 TV Series) : U.S. viewers per episode (millions)

Season	Episode number																						Average
Season	1	2	3	4	5	6	7	8	9	10	11	12	13	14	15	16	17	18	19	20	21	22	Average
1	1.57	1.32	1.13	0.96	0.95	0.96	0.87	0.93	0.94	0.82	0.88	0.77	0.74	0.74	0.65	0.59	0.70	0.67	0.71	0.60	0.63	0.59	0.85
2	0.65	0.73	0.73	0.66	0.58	0.66	0.77	0.61	0.65	0.59	0.62	0.57	0.60	0.62	0.60	0.57	0.71	0.62	0.58	–			0.63
3	0.46	0.42	0.37	0.30	0.34	0.40	0.32	0.33	0.34	0.43	0.36	0.40	0.36	0.39	0.41	0.36	0.42	0.43	–				0.38
4	0.40	0.45	0.30	0.36	0.36	0.31	0.33	0.35	0.34	0.30	0.31	0.36	0.39	–									TBD

Audience measurement performed by Nielsen Media Research

=== Season 1 ===
Viewership and ratings per episode of List of Charmed (2018 TV series) episodes
No.	Title	Air date	Rating/share (18–49)	Viewers (millions)	DVR (18–49)	DVR viewers (millions)	Total (18–49)	Total viewers (millions)
1	"Pilot"	October 14, 2018	0.5/2	1.57	0.6	1.39	1.1	2.96
2	"Let This Mother Out"	October 21, 2018	0.4/2	1.32	0.5	1.13	0.9	2.46
3	"Sweet Tooth"	October 28, 2018	0.3/1	1.13	0.4	0.86	0.7	1.99
4	"Exorcise Your Demons"	November 4, 2018	0.3/1	0.96	0.4	0.92	0.7	1.88
5	"Other Women"	November 11, 2018	0.3/1	0.95	0.4	0.87	0.7	1.82
6	"Kappa Spirit"	November 18, 2018	0.3/1	0.96	0.3	0.87	0.6	1.83
7	"Out of Scythe"	November 25, 2018	0.2/1	0.87	0.4	0.95	0.6	1.82
8	"Bug a Boo"	December 2, 2018	0.3/1	0.93	0.3	0.85	0.6	1.78
9	"Jingle Hell"	December 9, 2018	0.3/1	0.94	0.3	0.73	0.6	1.67
10	"Keep Calm and Harry On"	January 20, 2019	0.2/1	0.82	0.3	0.76	0.5	1.58
11	"Witch Perfect"	January 27, 2019	0.3/1	0.88	0.3	0.76	0.6	1.64
12	"You're Dead to Me"	February 17, 2019	0.2/1	0.77	0.3	0.76	0.5	1.53
13	"Manic Pixie Nightmare"	March 3, 2019	0.3/1	0.74	0.2	0.69	0.5	1.43
14	"Touched by a Demon"	March 10, 2019	0.2/1	0.74	0.2	0.57	0.4	1.31
15	"Switches & Stones"	March 17, 2019	0.2/1	0.65	0.2	0.63	0.4	1.28
16	"Memento Mori"	March 24, 2019	0.2/1	0.59	0.2	0.63	0.4	1.22
17	"Surrender"	March 31, 2019	0.2/1	0.70	0.3	0.63	0.5	1.33
18	"The Replacement"	April 21, 2019	0.2/1	0.67	0.2	0.61	0.4	1.28
19	"Source Material"	April 28, 2019	0.2/1	0.71	0.2	0.59	0.4	1.30
20	"Ambush"	May 5, 2019	0.2/1	0.60	0.2	0.55	0.4	1.15
21	"Red Rain"	May 12, 2019	0.2/1	0.63	0.2	0.56	0.4	1.19
22	"The Source Awakens"	May 19, 2019	0.2/1	0.59	0.2	0.63	0.4	1.22

=== Season 2 ===
Viewership and ratings per episode of List of Charmed (2018 TV series) episodes
No.	Title	Air date	Rating/share (18–49)	Viewers (millions)	DVR (18–49)	DVR viewers (millions)	Total (18–49)	Total viewers (millions)
1	"Safe Space"	October 11, 2019	0.2/1	0.65	0.2	0.59	0.4	1.25
2	"Things To Do In Seattle When You're Dead"	October 18, 2019	0.2/1	0.73	0.2	0.49	0.4	1.23
3	"Careful What You Witch For"	October 25, 2019	0.2/1	0.73	0.2	0.58	0.4	1.32
4	"Deconstructing Harry"	November 1, 2019	0.2/1	0.66	0.2	0.57	0.4	1.24
5	"The Truth about Kat and Dogs"	November 8, 2019	0.1/1	0.58	0.2	0.59	0.3	1.18
6	"When Sparks Fly"	November 15, 2019	0.2/1	0.66	0.1	0.44	0.3	1.10
7	"Past is Present"	November 22, 2019	0.2/1	0.77	0.2	0.44	0.4	1.20
8	"The Rules of Engagement"	December 6, 2019	0.2/1	0.61	0.1	0.40	0.3	1.09
9	"Guess Who's Coming to SafeSpace Seattle"	January 17, 2020	0.2/1	0.65	0.2	0.47	0.4	1.13
10	"Curse Words"	January 24, 2020	0.2/1	0.59	0.1	0.38	0.3	0.97
11	"Dance Like No One is Witching"	January 31, 2020	0.1	0.62	0.2	0.34	0.3	0.96
12	"Needs to Know"	February 7, 2020	0.2	0.57	0.2	0.44	0.4	1.01
13	"Breaking the Cycle"	February 21, 2020	0.2	0.60	0.1	0.39	0.3	0.99
14	"Sudden Death"	February 28, 2020	0.2	0.62	0.2	0.49	0.4	1.11
15	"Third Time's The Charm"	March 27, 2020	0.2	0.60	0.1	0.38	0.3	0.98
16	"The Enemy of My Frenemy"	April 3, 2020	0.1	0.57	0.2	0.49	0.3	1.06
17	"Search Party"	April 10, 2020	0.2	0.71	0.1	0.36	0.3	1.07
18	"Don't Look Back in Anger"	April 17, 2020	0.2	0.62	0.2	0.46	0.4	1.08
19	"Unsafe Space"	May 1, 2020	0.2	0.58	0.2	0.39	0.4	0.97

=== Season 3 ===
Viewership and ratings per episode of List of Charmed (2018 TV series) episodes
No.	Title	Air date	Rating (18–49)	Viewers (millions)	DVR (18–49)	DVR viewers (millions)	Total (18–49)	Total viewers (millions)
1	"An Inconvenient Truth"	January 24, 2021	0.1	0.46	—N/a	—N/a	—N/a	—N/a
2	"Someone's Going to Die"	January 31, 2021	0.1	0.42	—N/a	—N/a	—N/a	—N/a
3	"Triage"	February 14, 2021	0.1	0.37	—N/a	—N/a	—N/a	—N/a
4	"You Can't Touch This"	February 21, 2021	0.1	0.30	—N/a	—N/a	—N/a	—N/a
5	"Yew Do You"	February 28, 2021	0.1	0.34	—N/a	—N/a	—N/a	—N/a
6	"Private Enemy No. 1"	March 14, 2021	0.1	0.40	—N/a	—N/a	—N/a	—N/a
7	"Witch Way Out"	March 21, 2021	0.1	0.32	—N/a	—N/a	—N/a	—N/a
8	"O, The Tangled Web"	March 28, 2021	0.1	0.33	0.1	0.31	0.2	0.64
9	"No Hablo Brujeria"	April 11, 2021	0.1	0.34	0.1	0.34	0.2	0.68
10	"Bruja-Ha"	April 18, 2021	0.1	0.43	0.1	0.31	0.2	0.74
11	"Witchful Thinking"	May 7, 2021	0.1	0.36	0.1	0.34	0.2	0.71
12	"Spectral Healing"	May 14, 2021	0.1	0.40	0.1	0.26	0.2	0.67
13	"Chaos Theory"	May 21, 2021	0.1	0.36	0.1	0.25	0.2	0.61
14	"Perfecti Is the Enemy of Good"	June 11, 2021	0.1	0.39	0.1	0.29	0.2	0.68
15	"Schrodinger's Future"	June 18, 2021	0.1	0.41	0.1	0.36	0.2	0.77
16	"What to Expect When You're Expecting the Apocalypse"	June 25, 2021	0.1	0.36	0.1	0.34	0.2	0.70
17	"The Storm Before the Calm"	July 16, 2021	0.1	0.42	0.1	0.23	0.2	0.65
18	"I Dreamed a Dream..."	July 23, 2021	0.1	0.43	0.1	0.29	0.2	0.72

=== Season 4 ===
Viewership and ratings per episode of List of Charmed (2018 TV series) episodes
No.	Title	Air date	Rating (18–49)	Viewers (millions)	DVR (18–49)	DVR viewers (millions)	Total (18–49)	Total viewers (millions)
1	"Not That Girl"	March 11, 2022	0.1	0.40	0.1	0.32	0.2	0.72
2	"You Can't Go Home Again"	March 18, 2022	0.1	0.45	0.1	0.31	0.2	0.76
3	"Unlucky Charmed"	March 25, 2022	0.0	0.30	0.1	0.29	0.1	0.59
4	"Ripples"	April 1, 2022	0.1	0.36	0.1	0.31	0.2	0.67
5	"The Sisterhood of the Traveling Sandwich"	April 8, 2022	0.1	0.36	—N/a	—N/a	—N/a	—N/a
6	"The Tallyman Cometh"	April 15, 2022	0.1	0.31	0.1	0.23	0.1	0.55
7	"Cats and Camels and Elephants, Oh My..."	April 29, 2022	0.1	0.33	—N/a	—N/a	—N/a	—N/a
8	"Unveiled"	May 6, 2022	0.1	0.35	—N/a	—N/a	—N/a	—N/a
9	"Truth or Cares"	May 13, 2022	0.1	0.34	—N/a	—N/a	—N/a	—N/a
10	"Hashing it Out"	May 20, 2022	0.1	0.30	—N/a	—N/a	—N/a	—N/a
11	"Divine Secrets of the O.G. Sisterhood"	May 27, 2022	0.1	0.31	—N/a	—N/a	—N/a	—N/a
12	"Be Kind. Rewind."	June 3, 2022	0.1	0.36	—N/a	—N/a	—N/a	—N/a
13	"The End is Never the End"	June 10, 2022	0.1	0.39	—N/a	—N/a	—N/a	—N/a
