= Submission (disambiguation) =

Submission is the acknowledgement of the legitimacy of the power of one's superior or superiors.

Submission may also refer to:

== Films ==
- Submission (1976 film), an Italian erotic drama film
- Submission (2004 film), a Dutch short film about Islam
- Submission (2010 film), a Swedish documentary film
- Submission (2017 film), an American drama film

== Music ==
- "Submission", a song by Ash from the 2001 album Free All Angels
- "Submission", a song by Basement from the 2015 album Promise Everything
- "Submission", a song by Gorillaz (featuring Danny Brown and Kelela) from the 2017 album Humanz
- "Submission", a song by the Sex Pistols from the 1977 album Never Mind the Bollocks, Here's the Sex Pistols

== Other media ==
- Submission (novel), a 2015 novel by Michel Houellebecq (French title: Soumission)
- Submission (TV series), a 2016 American erotic mini-series

== Computing and technology ==
- Electronic submission, the concept of submitting manuscripts, papers, etc. through digital media
- Submission servers, mail submission agents which accept email from users and inject it into the email system

== Religion ==
- Ibadah, an Islamic principle of submission to divine will
- Islam, which means "submission"
- Submission/Submitter, a member of United Submitters International, an Islamic sect

== Sexuality ==
- Sexual submission, the practice of deferring to the will of another in a sexual context
  - Male submission, a situation in BDSM and other sexual activities in which the submissive partner is male
  - Female submission, an activity or relationship in which a woman submits to the direction of a sexual partner or has her body used sexually by or for the sexual pleasure of her partner

== Sports ==
- Submission (combat sports), a concept in martial arts and combat sports
- Submission hold, a type of hold that forces the receiver to submit
- Submission wrestling, a type of wrestling with the aim of obtaining submission using submission holds

== Other uses ==
- Submission (Alton Towers), an amusement ride
