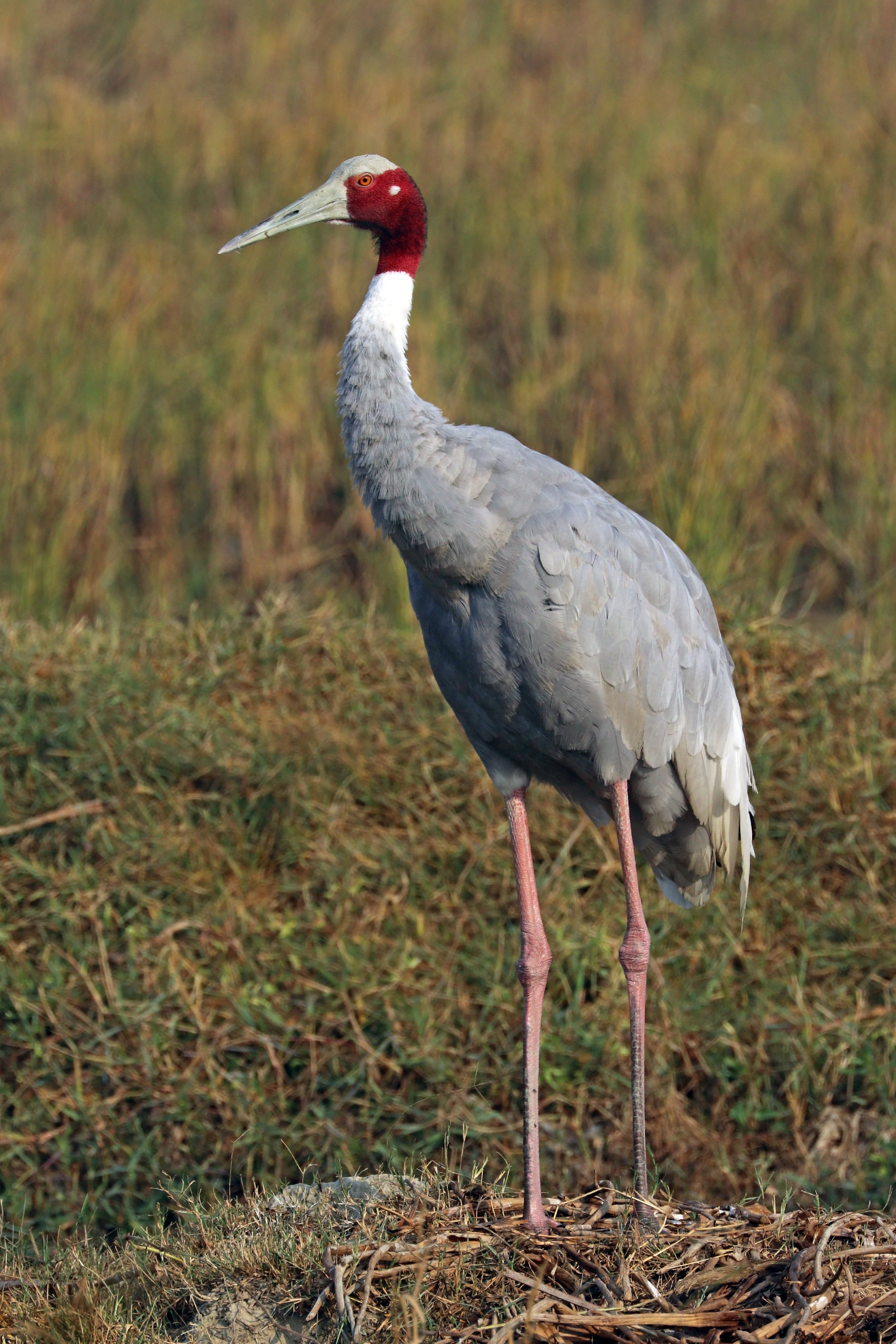
- A. a. antigone from India with the distinct white "collar"

Conservation status
- Vulnerable (IUCN 3.1)
- CITES Appendix II

Scientific classification
- Kingdom: Animalia
- Phylum: Chordata
- Class: Aves
- Order: Gruiformes
- Family: Gruidae
- Genus: Antigone
- Species: A. antigone

Binomial name
- Antigone antigone (Linnaeus, 1758)

Subspecies
- A. a. antigone (Linnaeus, 1758) (Indian sarus crane); A. a. sharpii (=sharpei) Blanford, 1895 (Indochinese or Burmese sarus crane, Sharpe's crane, red-headed crane); A. a. gilliae (=gillae) Schodde, 1988 (Australian sarus crane); A. a. luzonica Hachisuka, 1941 (Philippine sarus crane – extinct)
- Approximate current global distribution

Synonyms
- Ardea antigone Linnaeus, 1758; Grus antigone (Linnaeus, 1758); Grus collaris Boddaert, 1783

= Sarus crane =

Species of bird

The sarus crane (Antigone antigone) is a large nonmigratory crane found in parts of the Indian subcontinent, Southeast Asia, and northern Australia. The tallest of the flying birds, standing at a height of up to 1.8 m (5 ft 11 in), they are a conspicuous species of open wetlands in South Asia, seasonally flooded Dipterocarpus forests in Southeast Asia, and Eucalyptus-dominated woodlands and grasslands in Australia.

The sarus crane is easily distinguished from other cranes in the region by its overall grey colour and the contrasting red head and upper neck. They forage on marshes and shallow wetlands for roots, tubers, insects, crustaceans, and small vertebrate prey. Like other cranes, they form long-lasting pair bonds and maintain territories within which they perform territorial and courtship displays that include loud trumpeting, leaps, and dance-like movements. In India, they are considered symbols of marital fidelity, believed to mate for life and pine the loss of their mates, even to the point of starving to death.

The main breeding season is during the wet season, when the pair builds an enormous nest "island," a circular platform of reeds and grasses nearly two meters in diameter and high enough to stay above the shallow water surrounding it. Increased agricultural intensity is often thought to have led to declines in sarus crane numbers, but the largest known population of Sarus cranes are in northern India's Uttar Pradesh where small-holder agriculture, favorable farmer attitudes, wet crops such as flooded paddy and the extensive network of canals has benefited the species. The stronghold of the species is in India, where it is traditionally revered and lives in agricultural lands in close proximity to humans. Elsewhere, the species has been extirpated in many parts of its former range.

== Taxonomy ==
In 1743 the English naturalist George Edwards included an illustration and a description of the sarus crane in the first volume of his A Natural History of Uncommon Birds. He used the English name "The Greater Indian Crane". Edwards based his hand-coloured etching on a live specimen that he had drawn at the London home of the Admiral Charles Wager. When in 1758 the Swedish naturalist Carl Linnaeus updated his Systema Naturae for the tenth edition, he placed the sarus crane (Grus major Indica in Latin) with the herons and cranes in the genus Ardea. Linnaeus included a brief description, coined the binomial name Ardea antigone and cited Edwards' work. The specific epithet is based on Greek mythology. Antigone was the daughter of the Trojan king Laomedon. She was turned into a stork for comparing her own beauty with the goddess Hera. Linnaeus appears to have confused this myth with that of Gerana, queen of the pigmies, who considered herself more beautiful than Hera and was turned into a crane. The sarus crane was formerly placed in the genus Grus, but a molecular phylogenetic study published in 2010 found that the genus, as then defined, was polyphyletic. In the resulting rearrangement to create monophyletic genera, four species, including the sarus crane, were placed in the resurrected genus Antigone that had originally been erected by German naturalist Ludwig Reichenbach in 1853.

Edward Blyth published a monograph on the cranes in 1881, in which he considered the "sarus crane" of India to be made up of two species, Grus collaris and Grus antigone. Most modern authors recognize one species with three disjunct populations that are sometimes treated as subspecies, although the status of one extinct population from the Philippines is uncertain. The sarus cranes in India (referred to as A. a. antigone) are the largest, and in Myanmar to the east are replaced by a population that extends into Southeast Asia (referred to as A. a. sharpii). Sarus cranes from the Indian subcontinent are differentiated from the south-eastern population by the white collar below their bare head and upper neck, and their white tertiary flight feathers. The population in Australia (initially placed in A. a. sharpii (sometimes spelt sharpei but amended to conform to the rules of Latin grammar) was separated and named A. a. gilliae, sometimes spelt gillae or gillii), prior to a genetic analysis. A 2005 genetic analysis suggests that these three populations are representatives of a formerly continuous population that varied clinally. The Australian subspecies was designated only in 1988, with the species itself was first noticed in Australia in 1966 and regarded as a recent immigrant. Native Australians, however, differentiated between the sarus and the brolga, calling the sarus "the crane that dips its head in blood." Sarus cranes of the Australian population are similar to those in Southeast Asia in having no white on the neck and tertiary remiges, but are distinguished by a larger grey patch of ear coverts. The Australian population shows the most recent divergence from the ancestral form with an estimated 3000 generations of breeding within Australia. An additional subspecies, A. a. luzonica, was suggested for the population — now extinct — in the Philippines. No distinctive characteristic is known of this disappeared population.

Analysis of mitochondrial DNA from a limited number of specimens suggests that gene flow occurred within the continental Asian populations until the 20th-century reductions in range, and that Australia was colonized only in the Late Pleistocene, some 35,000 years ago. This has been corroborated by DNA microsatellite analyses on a large and widely distributed set of individuals in the sample. This study suggests further that the Australian population shows low genetic variability. As there exists the possibility of (limited) hybridization with the genetically distinct brolga, the Australian sarus crane can be expected to be an incipient species.

The common name 'sarus' is from the Hindi name (sāras) for the species. The Hindi word is derived from the Sanskrit word sarasa for the "lake bird", (sometimes corrupted to sārhans). British soldiers in colonial India who hunted the birds corrupted the name to serious or even cyrus.

== Description ==
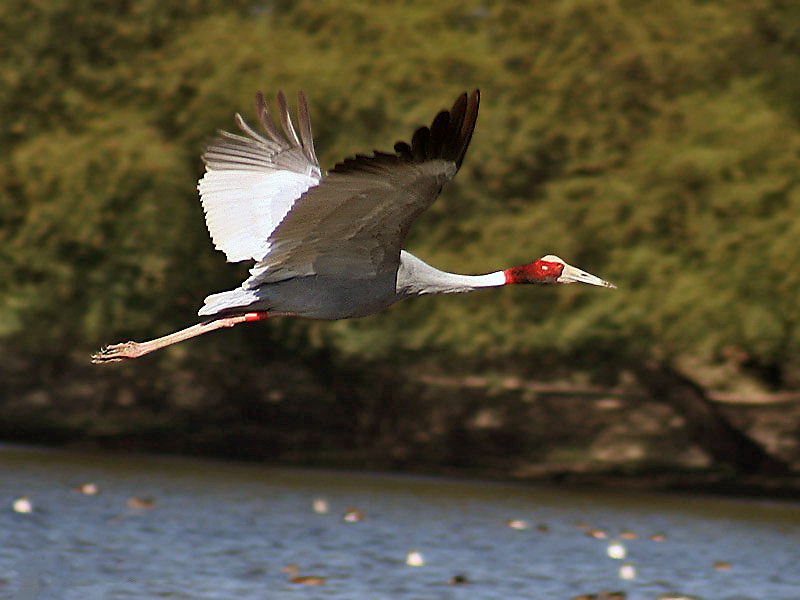
In flight, the black primaries contrast with the otherwise grey wings (Bharatpur, India)

The adult sarus crane is very large, with grey wings and body, a bare red head, collar and nape, a greyish crown, and a long, greenish-grey, pointed bill. In flight, the long neck is held straight, unlike that of a heron (which folds it back), and the black wing tips can be seen; the crane's long, pink legs trail behind them. This bird has a grey ear covert patch, orange-red irises, and a greenish-grey bill. Juveniles have a yellowish base to the bill and the brown-grey head is fully feathered.

Measurements

G. a. antigone
| Culmen | ♂ | 172–182 mm (6.8–7.2 in) |
| Wing | ♂ | 670–685 mm (26–27 in) |
| | ♀ | 625–645 mm (25–25 in) |
| Tail | ♂ | 255–263 mm (10–10 in) |
| Tarsus | ♂ | 310–355 mm (12–14 in) |

Combined
| Culmen | ♂ | 156–187 mm (6.1–7.4 in) |
| | ♀ | 155–169 mm (6.1–6.7 in) |
| Wing | ♂ | 514–675 mm (20–27 in) |
| | ♀ | 557–671 mm (22–26 in) |
| Tail | ♂ | 150–200 mm (5.9–7.9 in) |
| | ♀ | 100–200 mm (3.9–7.9 in) |
| Tarsus | ♂ | 269–352 mm (11–14 in) |
| | ♀ | 272–350 mm (11–14 in) |
| Weight | | 8.4 kg (19 lb) |

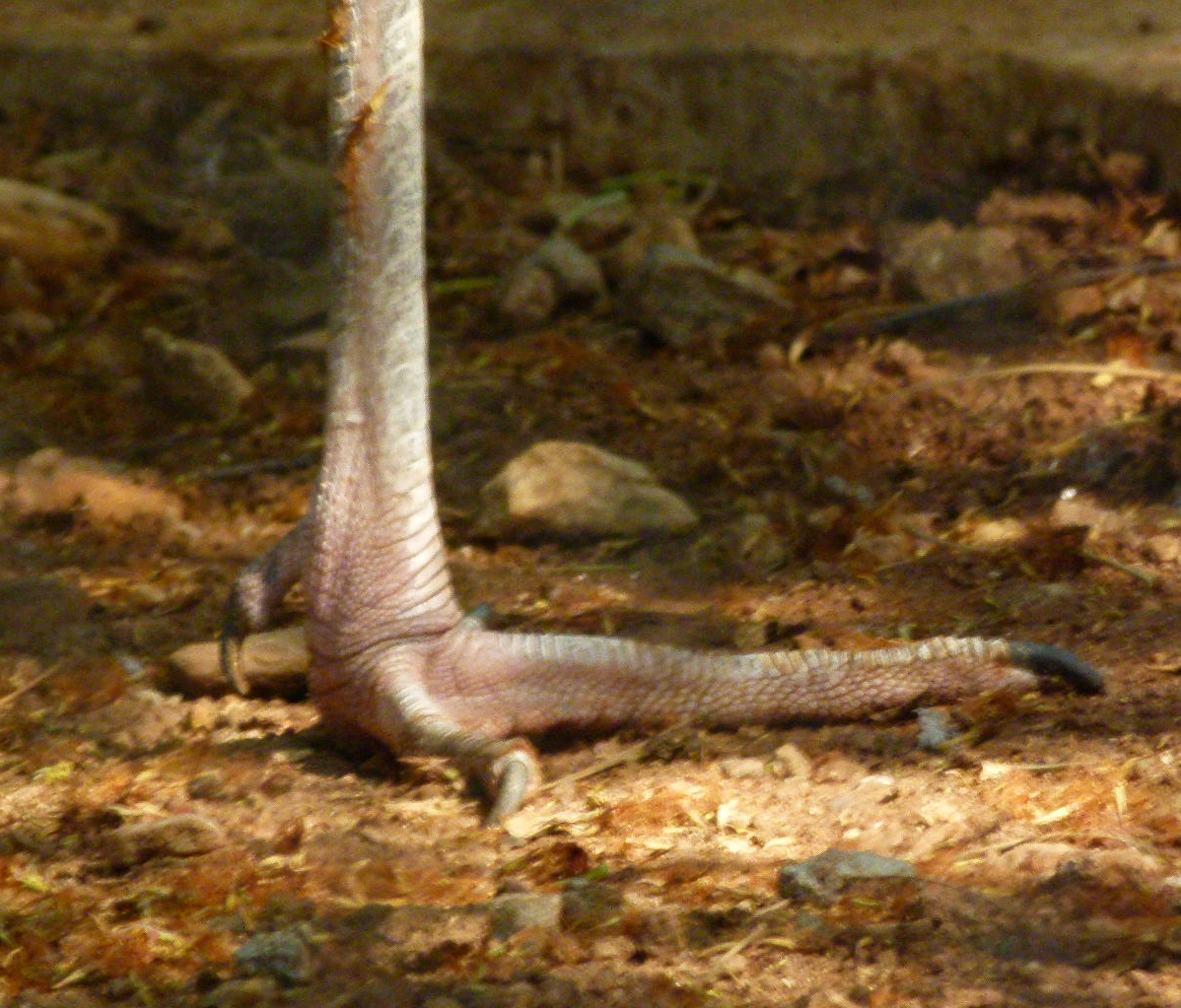
All cranes have a raised and much reduced hind toe.

The bare red skin of the adult's head and neck is brighter during the breeding season. This skin is rough and covered by feather follicles, and a narrow area around and behind the head is covered by black, bristly feathers. The sexes do not differ in plumage, although males are on average larger than females; males of the Indian population can attain a maximum height around 180 cm (5.9 ft), making them the world's tallest extant flying bird. The weight of nominate race individuals is 6.8–7.8 kg (15–17 lb), while five adults of A. a. sharpii averaged 8.4 kg (19 lb). Across the distribution range, their weight can vary from 5 to 12 kg (11 to 26 lb), height typically from 115 to 167 cm (45 to 66 in), and wingspan from 220 to 250 cm (87 to 98 in).

While individuals from northern Indian populations are among the heaviest cranes, alongside the red-crowned and wattled cranes, and the largest in their range, birds from Australia tend to be smaller. In Australia, the sarus can easily be mistaken for the more widespread brolga. The brolga has the red colouring confined to the head and not extending onto the neck. Body mass in Australian sarus cranes was found to average 6.68 kg (14.7 lb) in males and 5.25 kg (11.6 lb) in females, with a range for both sexes of 5.0 to 6.9 kg (11.0 to 15.2 lb). Thus, Australian sarus cranes average about 25% lighter than the northern counterparts and are marginally lighter on average than brolgas.

== Distribution and habitat ==
The species has historically been widely distributed on the lowlands of India along the Gangetic plains, extending south to the Godavari River, west to coastal Gujarat, the Tharparkar District of Pakistan, and east to West Bengal and Assam. The species no longer breeds in Punjab, though it winters regularly in the state. Sarus cranes are rare in West Bengal and Assam, and are no longer found in the state of Bihar. In Nepal, its distribution is restricted to the western and central lowland plains, with most of the population occurring in Rupandehi, Kapilvastu, and Nawalparasi districts.

Three distinct populations of sarus cranes were known in Southeast Asia: the northern population in China and Myanmar, the southern population in Cambodia and Vietnam, and the distinct, likely-extinct luzonica subspecies once found in the Philippines. The sarus used to extend to Thailand and further east into the Philippines, but may now be extinct in both these countries. In 2011, 24 captive-bred cranes raised from five founders were reintroduced into Thailand. A reasonably sized population of over 150 breeding pairs of sarus cranes has been discovered in the Ayeyarwadi delta, Myanmar, with additional cranes confirmed in the states of Kachin, Shan, and Rakhine. In Australia they are found only in the north-east, and are partly migratory in some areas. The global range has shrunk and the largest occupied area, and the largest known population, is in India. Increasing paddy fields accompanied by an increase in the network of irrigation canals during and prior to the Green Revolution may have facilitated increases in the distribution and numbers of sarus cranes due to an increase in reliable moisture levels in various locations in India. Although now found mainly at low elevations on the plains, some historical records exist from highland marshes further north in Harkit Sar and Kahag in Kashmir. The sarus crane breeds in some high elevation regions such as near the Pong Dam in Himachal Pradesh, where populations may be growing in response to increasing rice cultivation along the reservoir. In rice-dominated districts of Uttar Pradesh, sarus crane abundance (estimated as occupancy) was highest in the western districts, intermediate in the central districts, and minimal in the eastern districts. Sarus crane abundance was positively associated with percentage of wetlands on the landscape, and negatively with the percentage of area under rice cultivation.

In the Philippines, its distinct subspecies, luzonica, was first described to science in 1895, and was incorrectly labeled as subspecies sharpii at the time. The subspecies has been known to locals for centuries as tipol (or tipul and tibol) in the local languages. Around 1590-1610, Mentrida recorded a bird in Iloilo believed by some to be a sarus crane. In 1668, Francisco Ignacio Alcina noted of a bird, described as larger than Spanish cranes, in eastern Visayas (notably Samar) which locals call tihol. According to Alcina, the bird "was about a yard (vara) and a half tall... the color is light brown or dark ashy... It has a red head up to a good portion of its neck..." In 1702, Kameli recorded a bird called tipul in Samar as well. Regardless if the Visayan bird mentioned was the same with the Luzon-based sarus crane, the first known actual depiction of the Philippine sarus crane was in 1847, when famed Filipino painter Jose Honorato Lozano (ca. 1815-1885) made his masterpiece, “Indio Vestido de Anajao” (Filipino Wearing an Anahao Dress), which depicted a Filipino in the center, surrounded by two Philippine sarus cranes in Manila. In 1878, Mirasol published a paper about a crane sighting in Iloilo that some believe depicts as sarus crane. The Philippine sarus crane was a common Luzon resident until the 20th century. In 1909, American ornithologist Richard McGregor recorded that the subspecies was abundant within the vicinities of Cabanatuan in Nueva Ecija, as well as in Candaba Swamp. Zoologist Dean Conant Worcester recorded the abundance of the subspecies in Cagayan and Isabela in northern Luzon in 1906. Worcester noted that the birds nest on the ground in May, and by August, when the birds lose their long wing-feathers, allowing them to only rise by a few feet from the ground, hunters would pursue them on horseback with lassos. The birds, when running on the ground, are said to "run about as fast as deer". Japanese zoologist Masauji Hachisuka formally described the Philippine sarus crane from Luzon as a separate endemic subspecies called luzonica in 1941. According to Jean Delacour and Ernst Mayr, the luzonica subspecies, which they called the "Eastern Sarus Crane", was a resident subspecies in central and northern Luzon and bred in the province of Nueva Ecija. In 1971, John Dupont noted that the species was known in "northern and central Luzon". The subspecies is generally believed to have been decimated due to the destructive environmental policies of the Marcos dictatorship, which led to massive loss of sarus crane habitats due to expansive land conversions that benefitted Marcos cronies, severe poaching due to extreme poverty, and other environmental and social issues during the era. By 1991, Edward Dickinson classified the subspecies as “probably extirpated”. In 2000, Robert Kennedy classified the bird as “rare, perhaps extirpated.” In 2016, the WBCP Checklist classified the subspecies as extirpated. In 2020, DNA analyses revealed that a single sample from a Luzon sarus crane was more genetically related to the Australian subspecies (A. a. gillae) than the geographically closer Indochinese subspecies (A. a. sharpii). The study debunked previous claims that luzonica sarus cranes are the same with sharpii sarus cranes. The study strengthened the scientific consensus that luzonica is a distinct subspecies. The study also suggests that Australia, instead of mainland Asia, might be a more appropriate source of birds for the reintroduction of sarus cranes in the Philippines. In June 2025, a national symposium was convened by the Association of Systematic Biologists of the Philippines (ASBP) in Manila which brought together researchers from The Cairns Institute (TCI) and the University of the Philippines Los Baños (UPLB), with the target of reintroducing the sarus crane to the Philippines. Due to recent genetic analysis, the researchers concluded that the best genetic ‘fit’ for reintroduction is from Queensland, but there is still potential that the South-east Asian subspecies (G. a. sharpii) could be an alternative. A final confirmation was discussed for future analysis of more Tipol specimen. Researchers also inspected tipol specimens preserved at the University of Santo Tomás (UST) museum and the National Museum of Natural History (NMNH) in Manila. To increase the certainty around the genetic relationships of Tipol, as many specimens as possible are slated to be tested for their genetic affinities with both Australian and SE Asian Sarus. Three potential reintroduction sites were also discussed, where one is Lalaguna Marshland near the municipality of Lopez in Quezon province. The municipal council of Lopez has expressed enthusiasm for the potential reintroduction in Lalaguna, one of the last places where tipol were observed before becoming extirpated. The symposium also established a step-by-step approach on the reintroduction effort, namely, (i) confirmation of the appropriate source of birds for reintroduction; (ii) community engagement around the potential reintroduction sites and nationally; (iii) preliminary discussions with Philippine and source authorities and NGOs; (iv) selection of a preferred reintroduction site; (v) preparation and lodgement of a comprehensive costed project plan; (vi) project approval; (vii) fundraising and ongoing engagement for the reintroduction; (viii) acquisition and translocation of eggs or birds to a specialised purpose-built rearing facility in the Philippines; (ix) rearing and preparation for release under strict biosecure conditions; and (x) release and monitoring over a three to four year period - until a sustainable wild population can be established.

Field surveys and detailed observations of sarus cranes increased greatly in Myanmar by 2022, with a strong focus on the Ayeyarwadi delta. Surveys across multiple townships discovered over 150 pairs of breeding sarus cranes (with a maximum of 185 nests monitored in 2018), suggesting that the population in this region is far higher than was previously known. The vast majority of nests were located in rice paddies, with few in flooded grass patches.

Until recently, little was known of sarus crane ecology from Australia. Breeding records (confirmed sightings of nests with eggs, or of adult birds with flightless young) were known from only three locations, all in the Gulf Plains in Queensland. Two records are from near Normanton; one of adults with flightless chicks seen about 30 km west of the town and another of adults incubating eggs seen 7-km south of the town. The third record is a one-month study that provides details of 32 nests located within 10-km around Morr Morr cattle station in the Gilbert River floodplains. A 3,000-km survey along the Gulf of Carpentaria located 141 territorial, breeding pairs spread out across the floodplains of the Mitchell, Gilbert, and Flinders Rivers. Carefully mapping of breeding areas of sarus cranes in Australia is needed to understand their distribution range. They are uncommon in Kakadu National Park, where the species is often hard to find among the more numerous brolgas. Flocks in the non-breeding season are commonly seen in the Atherton Tablelands in northeastern Queensland.

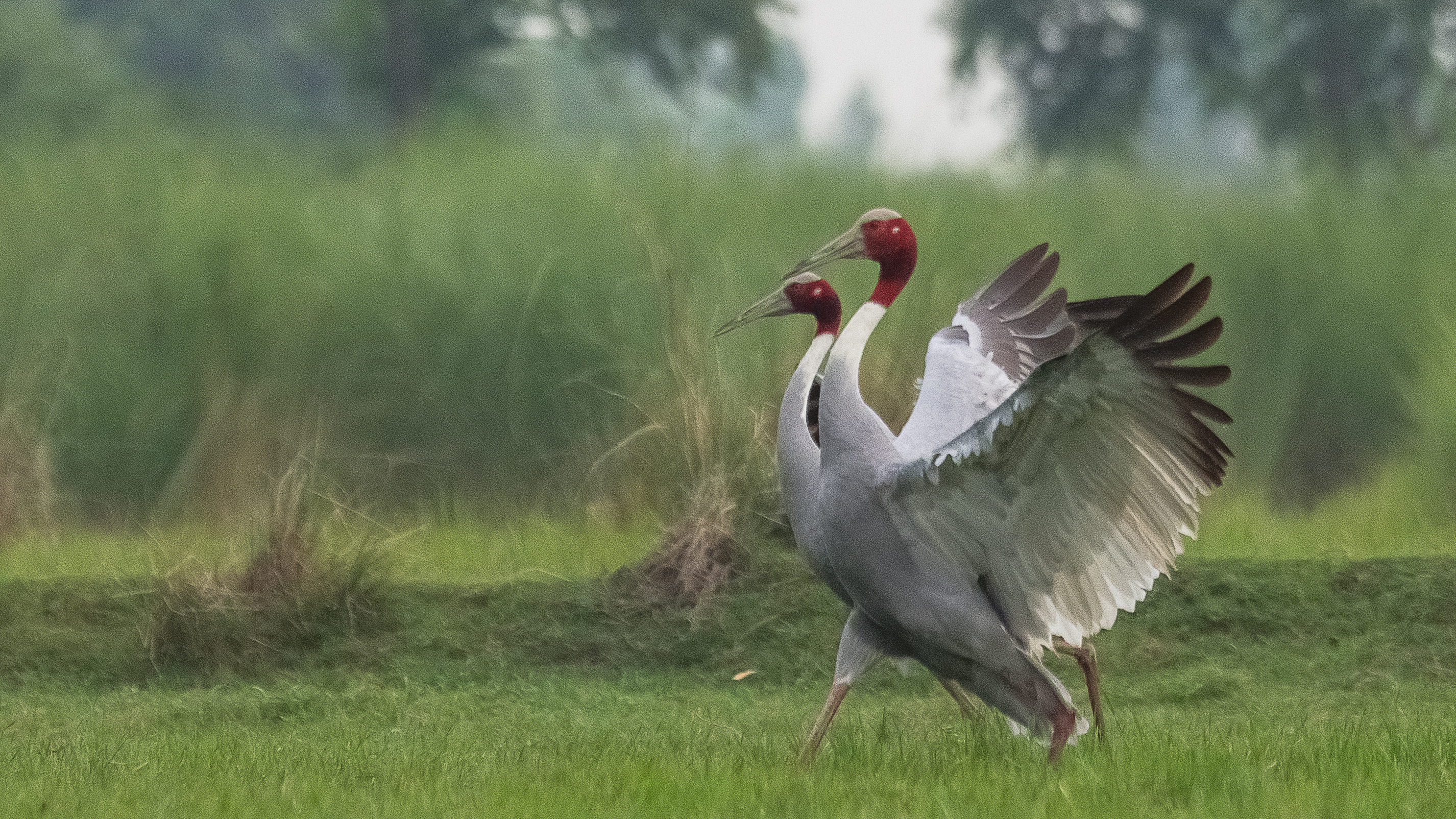
Sarus pair

In India, sarus cranes preferentially use wetlands for nesting, but also nest in uncultivated patches amid flooded rice paddies (called khet-taavadi in Gujarat), and in the rice paddies especially when wetlands are not available to breeding pairs. Breeding pairs are territorial and prefer to forage in natural wetlands, though wetland crops such as rice and wheat are also frequented. In south-western Uttar Pradesh, sarus cranes were found in wetlands of all sizes with larger numbers in larger wetlands.

In Australia, wintering, nonbreeding sarus cranes forage in areas with intensive agriculture (primarily maize, sugarcane, groundnuts) and smaller patches of cattle-grazing areas in the Atherton Tablelands. They were observed to feed on grain, nuts, and insects from a range of crop fields, including stubble of maize and peanut crops, hay crops, fields with potato, legumes, and seed crops, and after harvest in fields of sugarcane, grass, and fodder crops. Territorial, breeding sarus crane pairs in northern Queensland along the Gulf of Carpentaria use a range of habitats, but preferentially use low, open woodland on quaternary alluvial plains in outer river deltas and levees with vegetation comprising Lysiphyllum cunninghamii, Eucalyptus microtheca, Corymbia confertiflora, Melaleuca spp., Excoecaria parvifolia, Atalaya hemiglauca, Grevillea striata, Eucalyptus leptophleba, C. polycarpa, C. confertiflora, and C. bella.

== Ecology and behaviour ==
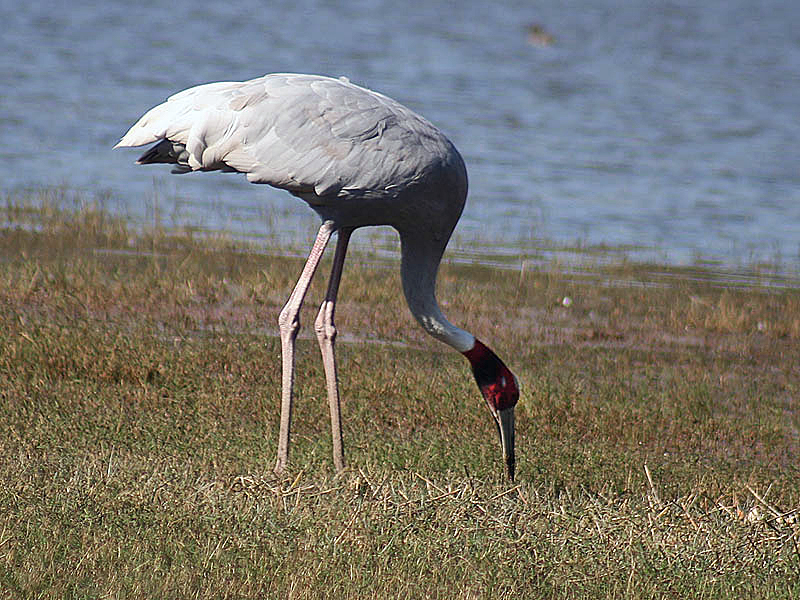
Foraging in marshland (Bharatpur)

While many other cranes make long migrations, sarus cranes are largely nonmigratory, although some populations do migrate short distances. In South Asia, four distinct population-level behaviours have been noted: The first is the "wintering population" of a small number of sarus cranes that use wetlands in the state of Punjab during winters. The source of this population is unclear, but is very likely to be from the growing population in Himachal Pradesh. The second is the "expanding population" consisting of cranes appearing in new areas following new irrigation structures in semiarid and arid areas primarily in Gujarat and Rajasthan. The third is the "seasonally migratory" population, also primarily in the arid zone of Gujarat and Rajasthan. Cranes from this population aggregate in remaining wetlands and reservoirs during the dry summer, and breeding pairs set up territories during the rainy season (July – October) remaining on territories throughout the winter (November – March). The fourth population is "perennially resident" and found in areas such as southwestern Uttar Pradesh, where artificial and natural water sources enable cranes to stay in the same location throughout the year. Migratory populations are also known from Southeast Asia and Australia.

Pair behaviour

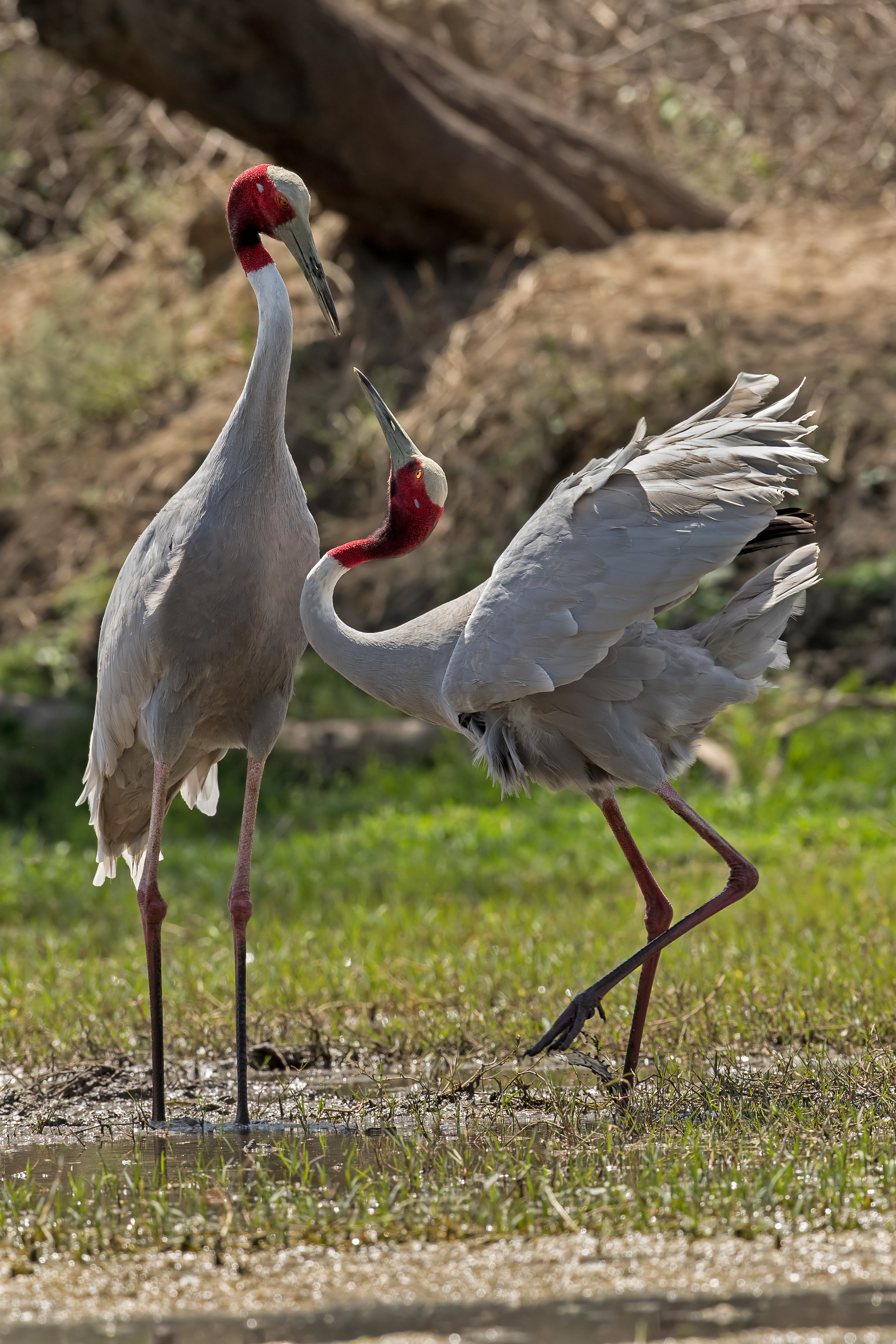
Bowing display

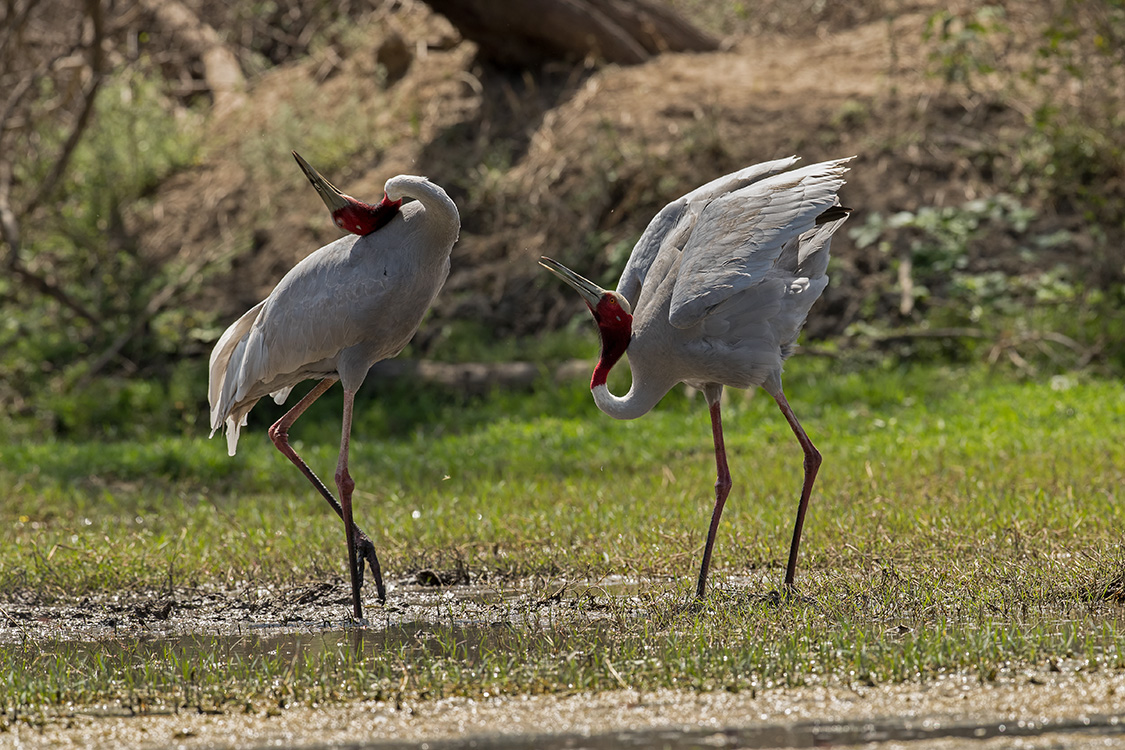

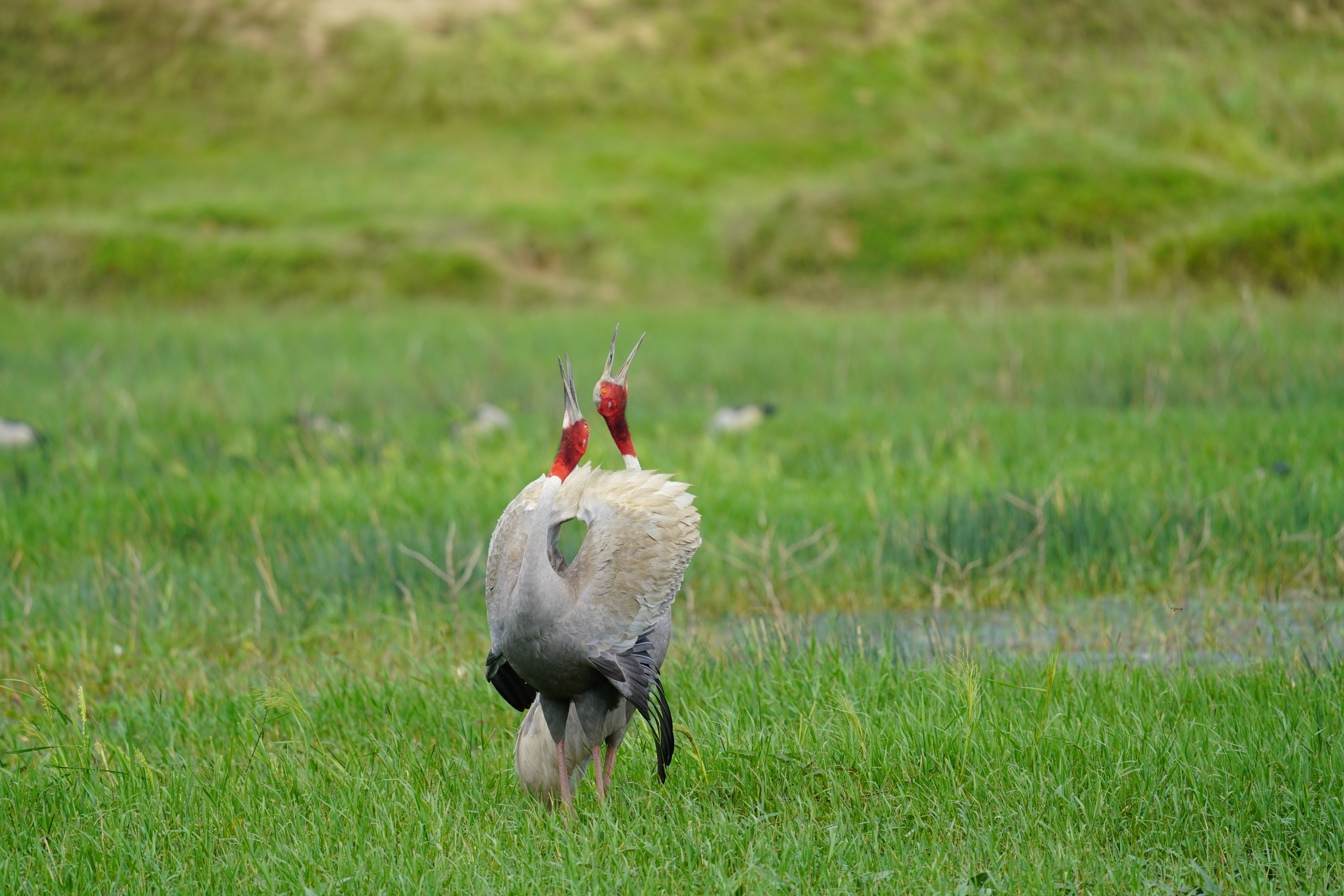

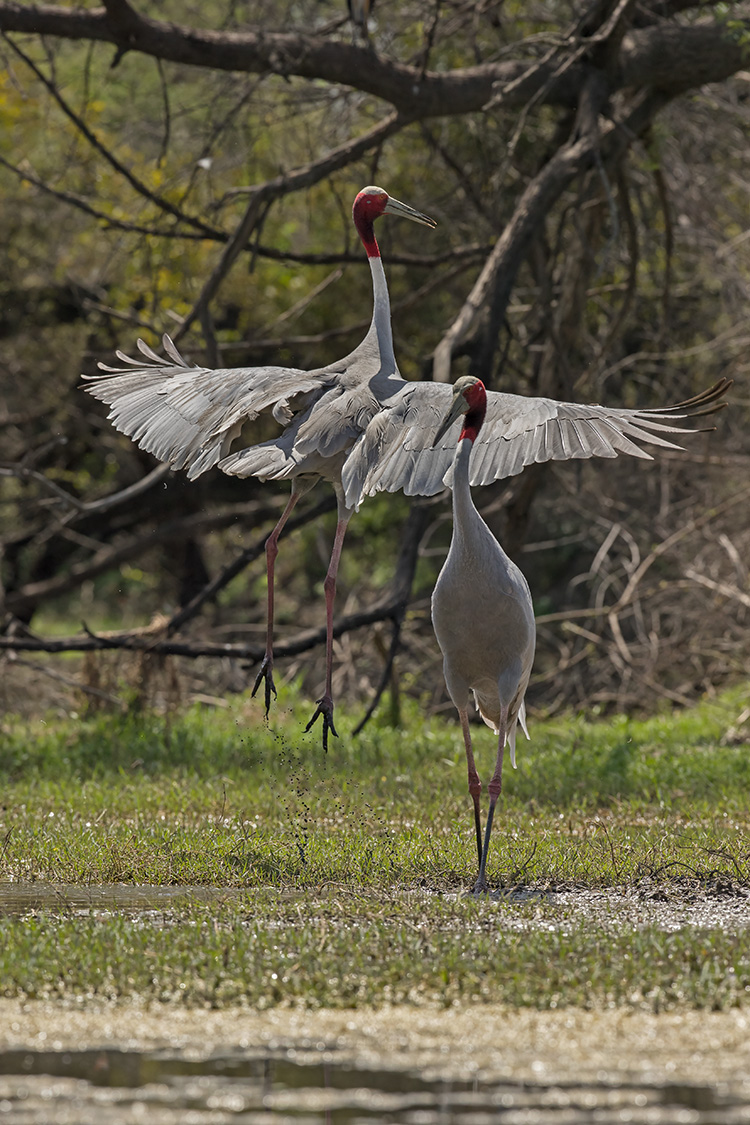
Leap

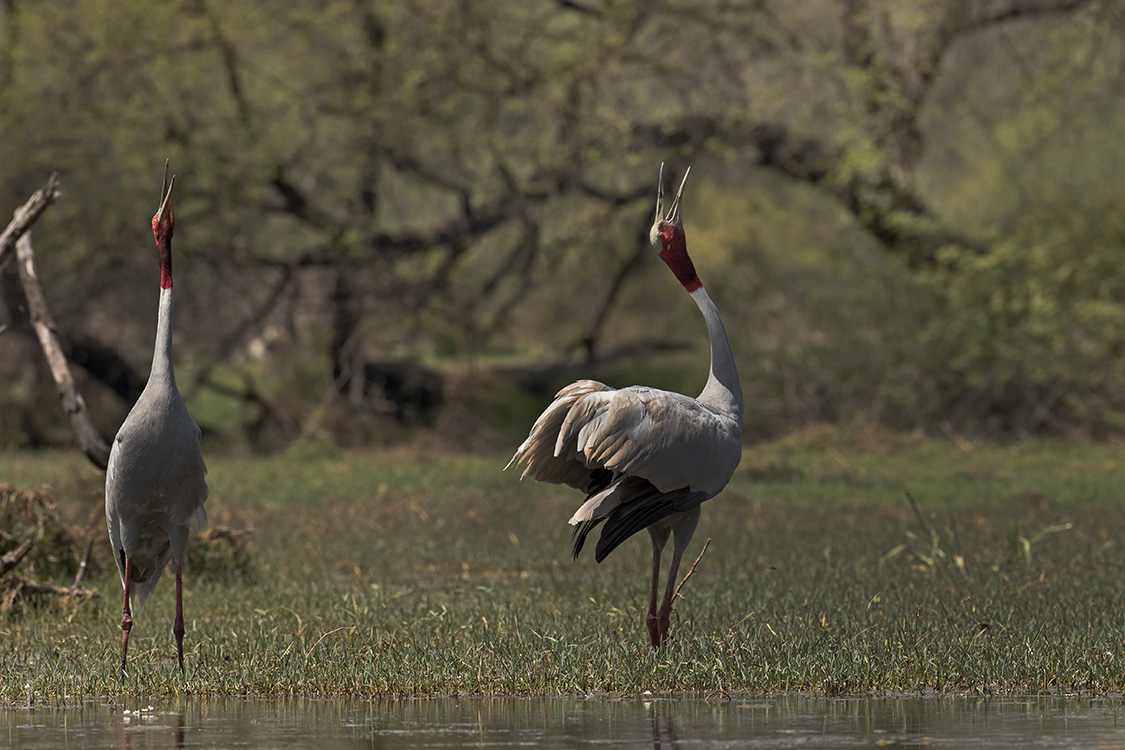
Unison calling

Breeding pairs maintain territories that are defended from other cranes using a large repertoire of calls and displays. In Uttar Pradesh, less than a tenth of the breeding pairs maintain territories at wetlands; the rest of the pairs are scattered in smaller wetlands and agricultural fields. Non-breeding birds form flocks that vary from 1–430 birds. In semi-arid areas, breeding pairs and successfully fledged juveniles depart from territories in the dry season and join non-breeding flocks. In areas with perennial water supply, as in the western plains of Uttar Pradesh, breeding pairs maintain perennial territories. The largest known flocks are from the 29 km^{2} (11 mi^{2}) Keoladeo National Park – with as many as 430 birds, and from unprotected, community-owned wetlands in Etawah and Mainpuri districts in Uttar Pradesh, ranging from 245 to 412 birds. Flocks of over 100 birds are also reported from Gujarat in India and Australia. Sarus crane populations in Keoladeo National Park have been noted to drop from over 400 birds in summer to just 20 birds during the monsoon. In areas with perennial wetlands on the landscape, such as in western Uttar Pradesh, numbers of nonbreeding sarus cranes in flocks can be relatively stable throughout the year. In Etawah and Mainpuri districts, nonbreeding sarus cranes constituted up to 65% of the regional population. Breeding pairs in Australia similarly defend territories from neighbouring crane pairs, and nonbreeding birds are found in flocks frequently mixed with brolgas.

The most common social units for Sarus cranes are breeding pairs that defend territories within which they raise young, and non-breeding cranes that live in flocks. Paired birds can be recognized by their behaviour of rendering unison calls, or duets, that they use either at the border of their territories towards neighbouring crane pairs, or on the nest when adults change incubation duties, or in response to intrusions of other Sarus cranes into or over their territories. Rarely, Sarus crane pairs allow a third crane into their territories forming trios that render synchronized unison calls termed as "triets". Sarus crane trios are rare (1.6% of 11,591 observed groups) but ubiquitous, are both polyandrous and polygynous, improve breeding success, are seen more in areas that have more non-breeding flocks, and are largely formed in areas with poor quality habitat and territories. Triets are structurally distinct from duets having much lower frequencies and being longer, but it is not known if there is a functional significance for this difference. A single polyandrous trio observed had a young male as the third bird (recognized by coloration of the primaries) which suggests that breeding pairs may allow younger birds into their territories to help raise chicks as trios. The advantage of being in a trio for breeding pairs is clearly improved breeding success and perhaps also additional assistance to defend territories. However, the advantage to third birds is not yet known and is suspected to provide younger cranes with practice in raising chicks and defending territories. Social units of cranes are very poorly studied and it is thought unlikely that trios are only found in sarus cranes.

They roost in shallow water, where they may be safe from some ground predators. Adult birds do not moult their feathers annually, but feathers are replaced about once every two to three years.

=== Feeding ===
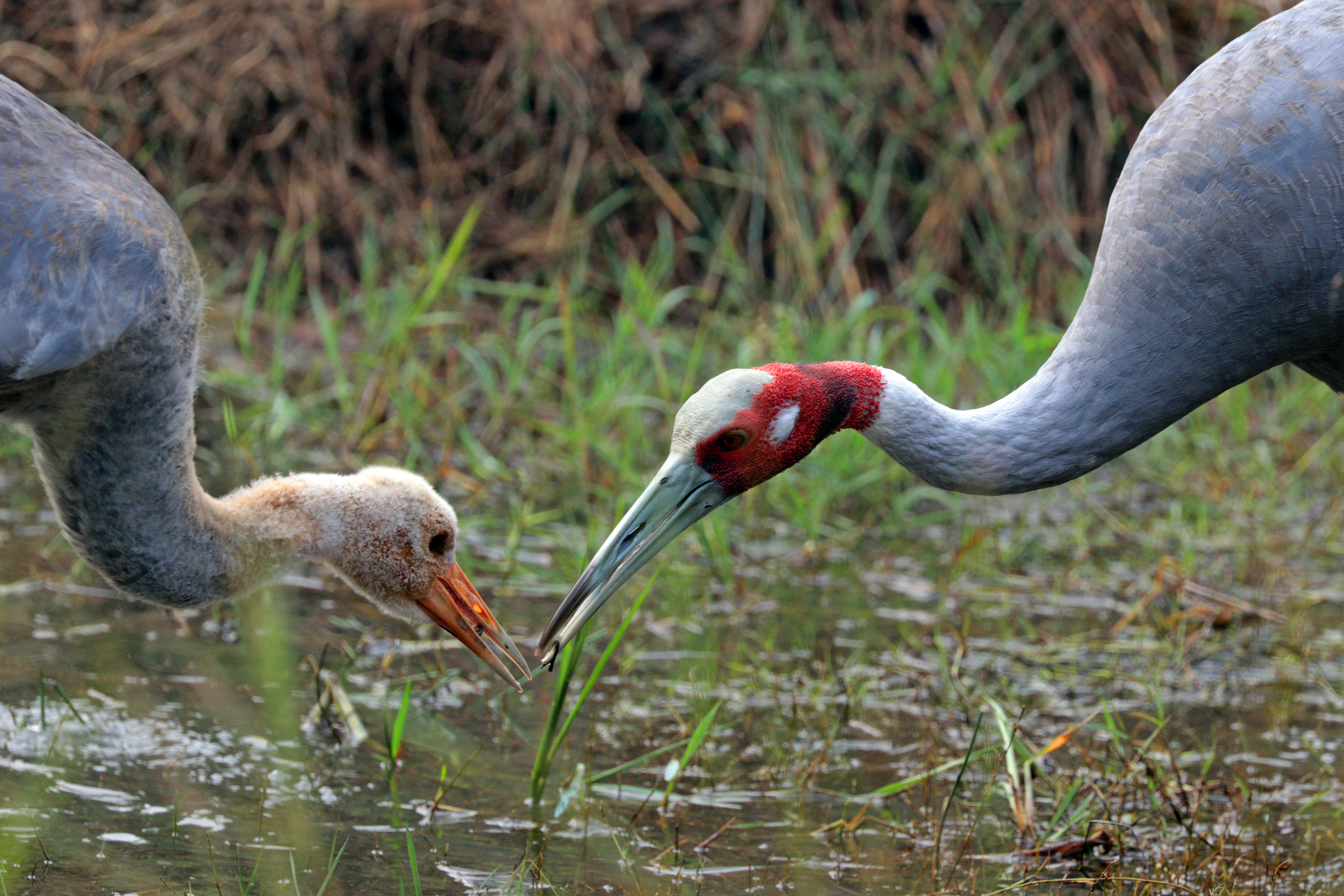
Feeding juvenile, Lumbini, Nepal

Sarus cranes forage in shallow water (usually with less than 30 cm (0.98 ft) depth of water) or in fields, frequently probing in mud with their long bills. In the dry season (after breeding), sarus cranes in Anlung Pring Sarus Crane Conservation Area, Cambodia, used wetlands with 8–10 cm of water. They are omnivorous, eating insects (especially grasshoppers), aquatic plants, fish (perhaps only in captivity), frogs, crustaceans, and seeds. Occasionally tackling larger vertebrate prey such as water snakes (Fowlea piscator), sarus cranes may in rare cases feed on the eggs of birds and turtles. Very few instances of sarus crane adults hunting and feeding chicks of other waterbirds are known, with two published observations of adult birds hunting chicks of the Grey-headed Swamphen Porphyrio poliocephalus. In north India, this behaviour appears restricted to around Delhi, and may be a novel habit of one pair that is learnt by chicks who have dispersed to nearby wetlands. Plant matter eaten includes tubers, corms of aquatic plants, grass shoots as well as seeds and grains from cultivated crops such as peanuts and cereal crops such as rice. In the dry season, cranes flocking in Southeast Asian wetlands are in areas with an abundance of Eleocharis dulcis and E. spiralis, both of which produce tubers on which the cranes are known to feed. In their breeding grounds in north-eastern Australia, isotopic analyses on molted feathers revealed sarus crane diets to comprise a great diversity of vegetation, and restricted to a narrow range of trophic levels.

=== Courtship and breeding ===
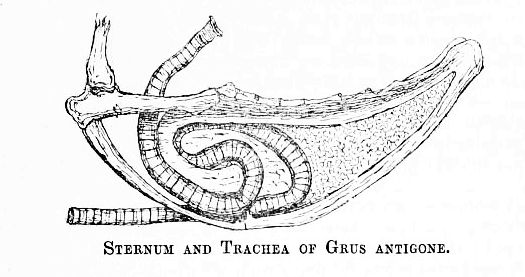
The long, coiled trachea that produces the trumpeting calls

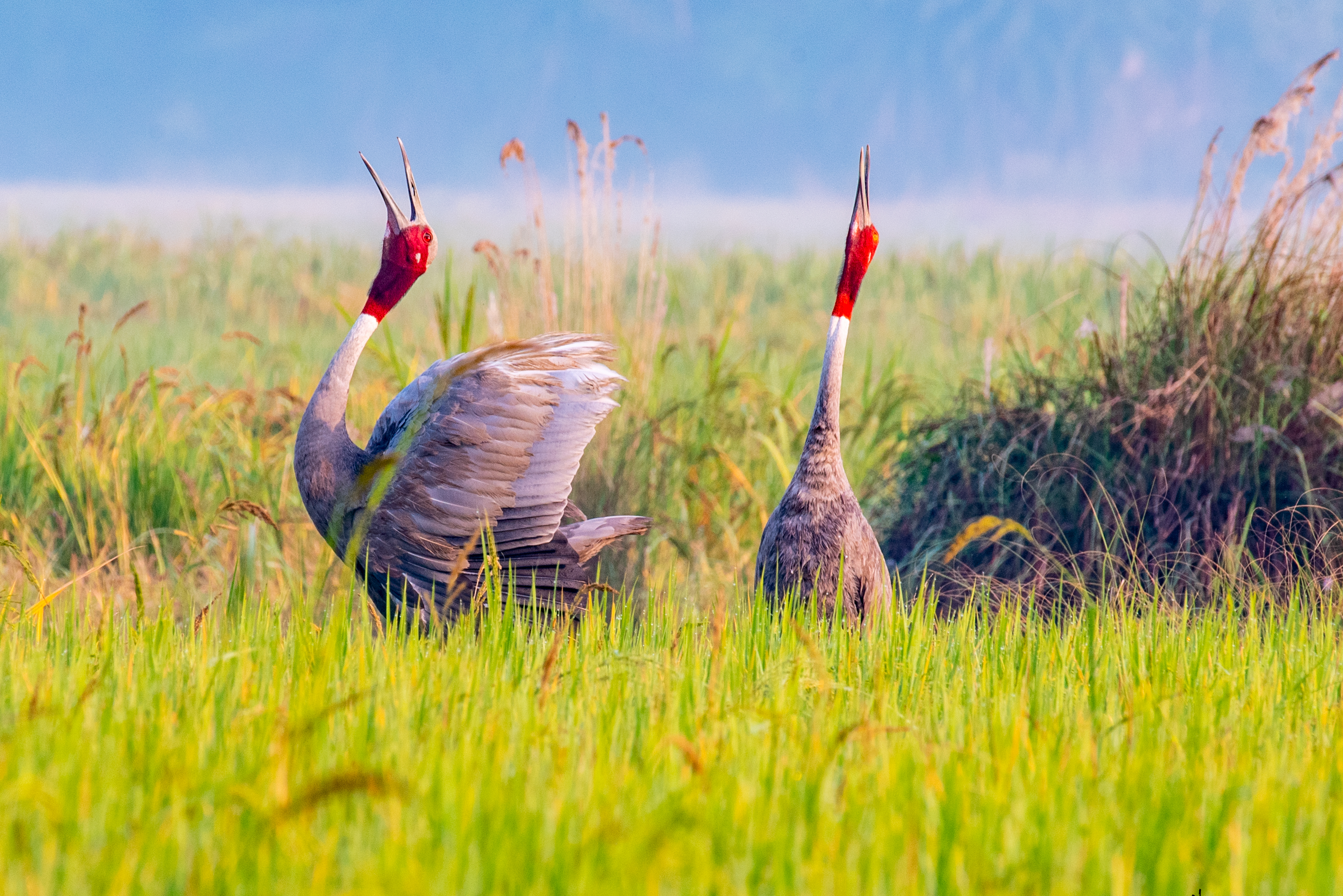
A trumpeting pair

Sarus cranes have loud, trumpeting calls, which, as in other cranes, are produced by the elongated windpipe that forms coils within the sternal region. Pairs may indulge in spectacular displays of calling in unison and posturing. These include "dancing" movements that are performed both during and outside the breeding season and involve a short series of jumping and bowing movements made as one of the pair circles around the other. Dancing may also be a displacement activity, when the nest or young is threatened. The cranes breed mainly during the monsoons in India (from July to October, although a second brood may occur), and breeding has been recorded in all the months. They build large nests, platforms made of reeds and vegetation in wet marshes or paddy fields. The nest is constructed within shallow water by piling up rushes, straw, grasses with their roots, and mud so that the platform rises above the level of the water to form a little island. The nest is unconcealed and conspicuous, being visible from afar, and defended fiercely by the pair.

Paired sarus cranes frequently produce coordinated trumpets, or duets, that are thought to play a role in pair-bonding (due to the requirement for close coordination) with a territorial function. Sarus crane duets did not have strong geographical structuring (or dialects, as seen in some bird species) but instead had greater similarity between geographically proximate sites. Despite being closely coordinated, it was possible to clearly identify the contributions from the male and female birds in a sarus crane duet suggesting that the otherwise monomorphic birds acoustically transmitted gender signatures in their duets.

Data collated over a century from South Asia show sarus cranes nesting throughout the year. More focused and shorter-term observations, however, show nesting patterns to be closely tied to rainfall patterns. An exception to this rule was the unseasonal nesting observed in the artificially flooded Keoladeo-Ghana National Park, and in marshes created by irrigation canals in Kota district of Rajasthan, India. Based on these observations, unseasonal nesting (or nesting outside of the monsoon) of sarus cranes was thought to be due to either the presence of two populations, some pairs raising a second brood, or unsuccessful breeding by some pairs in the normal monsoon season, prompting them to nest again when conditions such as flooded marshes remain. A comprehensive assessment of unseasonal nesting based on collation of observations of over 5,000 breeding records, however, showed that unseasonal nesting by sarus cranes in South Asia was very rare and was only carried out by pairs that did not succeed in raising chicks in the normal nesting season. Unseasonal nests were initiated in years when rainfall extended beyond the normal June–October period, and when rainfall volume was higher than normal; or when artificial wet habitats were created by man-made structures such as reservoirs and irrigation canals to enhance crop production. Nest initiation in northern Queensland is also closely tied to rainfall patterns, with most nests being initiated immediately after the first major rains.

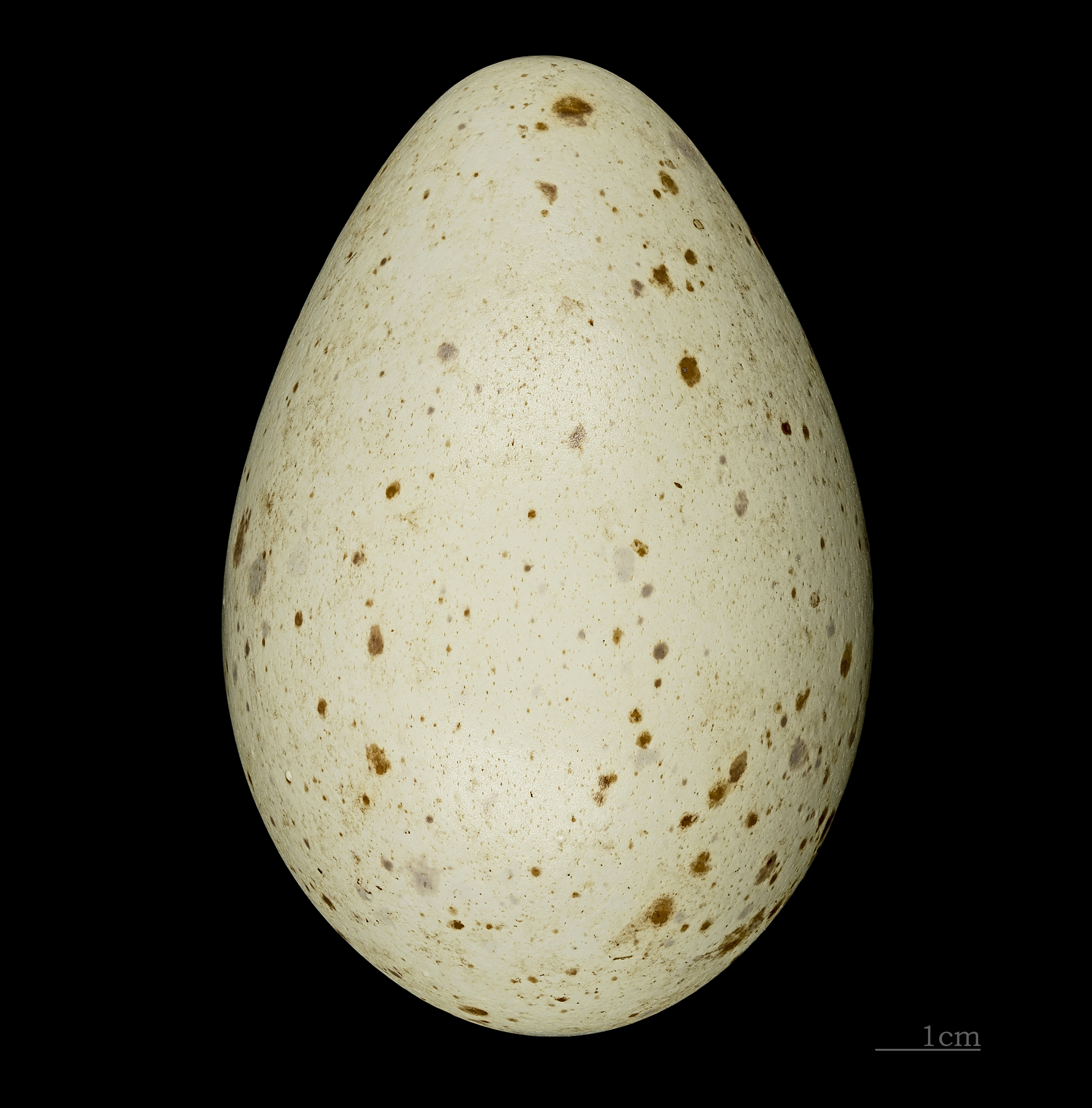
Egg

The nests can be more than 2 m (6 ft 7 in) in diameter and nearly 1 m (3 ft 3 in) high. Pairs show high fidelity to the nest site, often refurbishing and reusing a nest for as many as five breeding seasons. The clutch is one or two eggs (rarely three or four) which are incubated by both sexes for about 31 days (range 26–35 days). Eggs are chalky white and weigh about 240 grams. When disturbed from the nest, parents may sometimes attempt to conceal the eggs by attempting to cover them with material from the edge of the nest. The eggshells are removed by the parents after the chicks hatch either by carrying away the fragments or by swallowing them. About 30% of all breeding pairs succeed in raising chicks in any year, and most of the successful pairs raise one or two chicks each, with brood sizes of three being rare. One survey in Australia found 60% of breeding pairs to have successfully fledged chicks. This high success rate is attributed to above-normal rainfall that year. The chicks are fed by the parents for the first few days, but are able to feed independently after that, and follow their parents for food. When alarmed, the parent cranes use a low korr-rr call that signals chicks to freeze and lie still. Young birds stay with their parents until the subsequent breeding season. In captivity, birds breed only after their fifth year. The sarus crane is widely believed to pair for life, but cases of "divorce" and mate replacement have been recorded.

Hybridization and introgression between Sarus cranes and brolgas (G. rubicundus) have been recorded in Australia, with hybrid birds being named "Sarolgas". One genetic analyses of 389 feathers found nine hybrid individuals with four of these being backcrosses, and found about 10 times more hybrids relative to field observations of birds with obvious hybrid characteristics. Field surveys in Queensland, Australia have identified hybrids (off-spring of a pair consisting of one sarus and one brolga) and back-crosses (off-spring of a hybrid and an adult of either sarus or brolga), with hybrids being easily identifiable with field characteristics. Hybrids were very widely distributed across Queensland, but were very rare comprising between 0.105 and 0.265 percent of the total cranes counted during field surveys. Hybrid birds had intermediate extent of comb, the colour of the comb was intermediate (between the "ruby red" of the brolgas and the "scarlet-red" of sarus), intermediate face coloration, variable visibility of the auricular patch, intermediate eye coloration, and intermediate leg colouration of the two species. Hyrbid adults were observed pairing with both sarus and brolgas, and back-crossed juveniles were not easily identifiable as they closely resembled one or the other parent crane species. Crane pairs that were an adult hybrid and one of the crane species showed behaviours identical to normal pairs of both species - they were strongly territorial during the breeding season, produced duets whenever territories were visited by other cranes, stayed on the same territory year after year, and raised juveniles together. Most hybrids were seen in floodplains where populations of sarus and brolgas were more even, and very few hybrids were seen in floodplains that had either of the crane species dominating, which suggests that an even mix of the two crane species likely provides more opportunities for mixed-species pairs to form.

=== Mortality factors ===
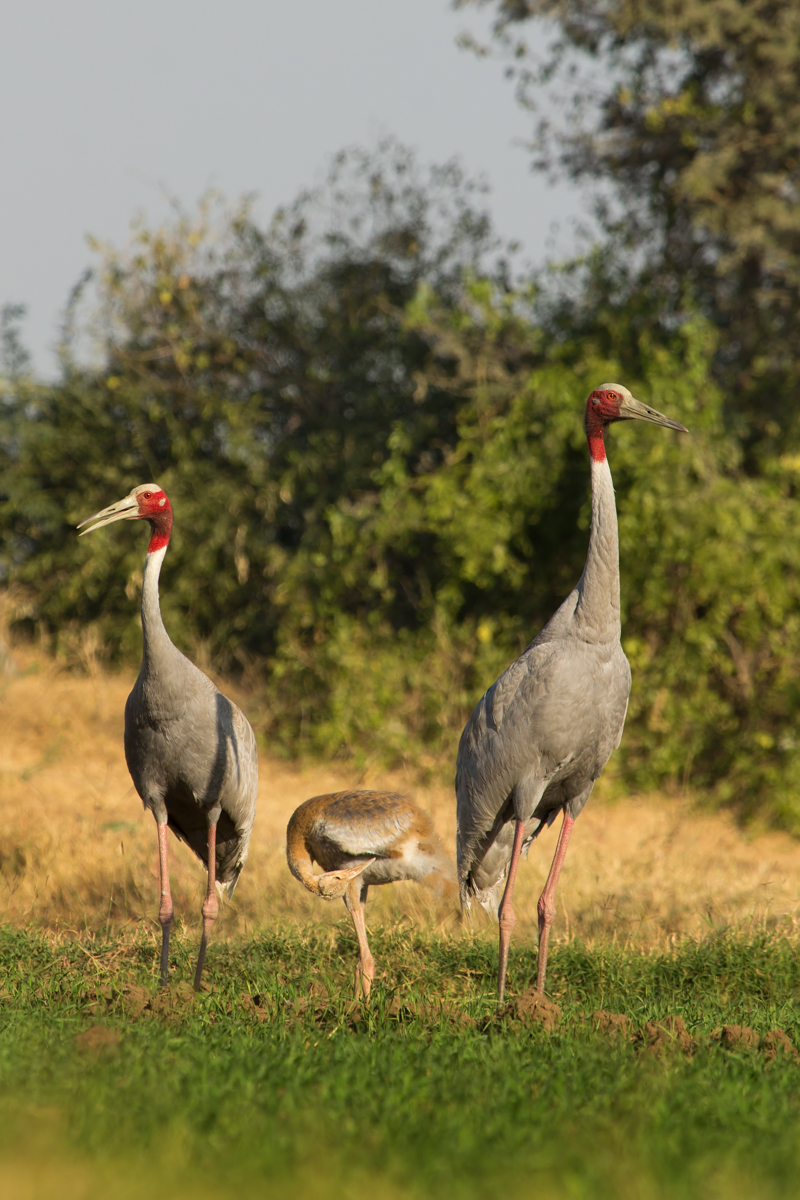
A pair with young in Velavadar

Healthy adult sarus cranes have no predators. However, eggs are often destroyed at the nest by jungle crows (Corvus macrorhynchos) and house crows (C. splendens) in India and Myanmar. In Australia, suspected predators of young birds include the dingo (Canis dingo) and fox (Vulpes vulpes), while brahminy kites (Haliastur indus) have been known to take eggs. Removal of eggs by farmers (to reduce crop damage) or children (in play), or by migrant labourers for food, or opportunistic egg collection during trips to collect forest resources are prominent causes of egg mortality. Between 31 and 100% of nests with eggs can fail to hatch eggs for these reasons. Chicks are also prone to predation (estimated at 8%) and collection at the nest, but more than 30% die of unknown reasons.

Breeding success (percentage of eggs hatching and surviving to fledging stage) has been estimated to be about 20% in Gujarat and 51–58% in south-western Uttar Pradesh. In areas where farmers are tolerant, nests in flooded rice fields and those in wetlands have similar rates of survival. Pairs that nest later in the season have a lower chance of raising chicks successfully, but this improves when territories have more wetlands. Nest success (percentage of nests in which at least one egg hatched) for 96 sarus nests that were protected by locals during 2009–2011 via a payment-for-conservation program was 87% in Cambodia. Nest success of nests monitored with the active participation of farmers in Myanmar was very high (323 out of 356 nests observed between 2016 and 2018 were successful), though chick survival has not yet been measured in Myanmar. More pairs are able to raise chicks in years with higher total rainfall, and when territory quality was undisturbed due to increased farming or development. Permanent removal of pairs from the population due to developmental activities caused reduced population viability, and was a far more important factor impacting breeding success relative to total annual rainfall.

Age and plumage changes

Breeding success in Australia has been estimated by counting the proportion of young-of-the-year in wintering flocks in the crop fields of Atherton Tablelands. Young birds constituted 5.32% to 7.36% of the wintering population between 1997 and 2002. It is not known if this variation represents annual differences in conditions in the breeding areas or if it included biases such as different proportions of breeding pairs traveling to the Atherton Tablelands to over-winter. It is also not known how these proportions equate to more standard metrics of breeding success such as proportions of breeding pairs succeeding in raising young birds. One multi-floodplain survey in Australia found 60% of all breeding pairs to have raised at least one chick, with 34% of successful pairs fledging two chicks each. Little is known about the diseases and parasites of the sarus crane, and their effects on wild bird populations. A study conducted at the Rome zoo noted that these birds were resistant to anthrax. Endoparasites that have been described include a trematode, Opisthorhis dendriticus from the liver of a captive crane at the London zoo and a Cyclocoelid (Allopyge antigones) from an Australian bird. Like most birds, they have bird lice and the species recorded include Heleonomus laveryi and Esthiopterum indicum.

In captivity, sarus cranes have been known to live for as long as 42 years. (Note: Flower (1938) notes only 26 years in captivity) Premature adult mortality is often the result of human actions. Accidental poisoning by monocrotophos, chlorpyrifos and dieldrin-treated seeds used in agricultural areas has been noted. Adults have been known to fly into power lines and die of electrocution, and a detailed study in one location with a very high density and population of sarus cranes showed that about 1% of the local population is killed due to electricity wire related deaths each year. Most dying adults each year were cranes that were part of non-breeding flocks, and few territorial breeding adults died. Practically all of the territorial breeding adults that died hit wires that were at the edge of their territories, which were usually roads that had supply wires running along the entire length of the roads. Breeding, territorial sarus crane pairs regularly interacted with each other at the edges of their territories increasing the possibility of their coming into contact with electricity wires.

==== Conservation status ====
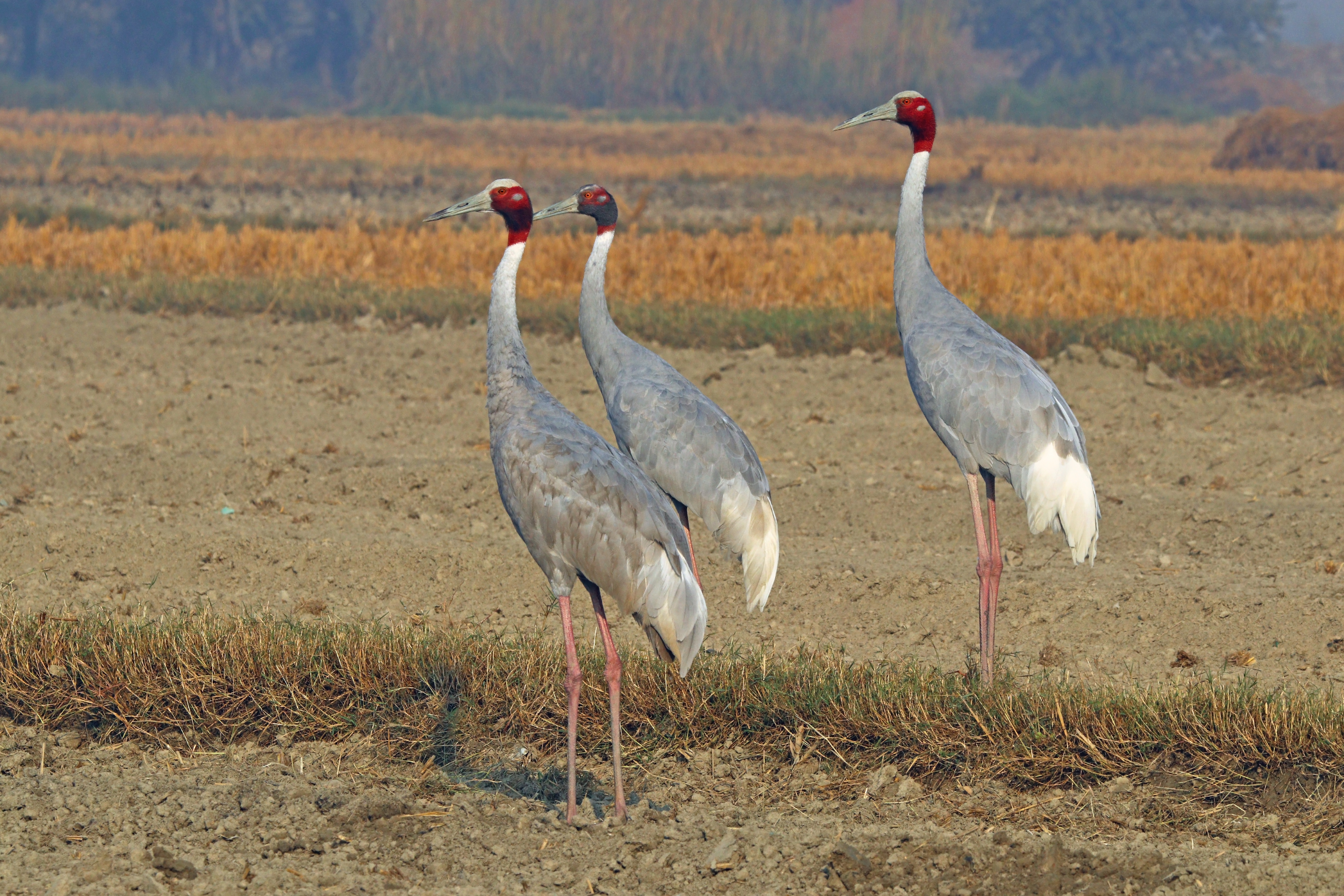
Two adults with a subadult in the middle

As of 2025, the total population of the sarus crane is estimated to be 16,000 mature individuals (range: 15,000 – 17,500). The nominate subspecies of South Asia is expected to have the largest population, circa 10,500 individuals, with A. a. sharpii estimated to have only 400 – 600 mature individuals. The subspecies A. a. gillae of Australia likely has 3,000 – 5,000 mature individuals.

Sarus cranes are considered sacred, and the birds are traditionally unharmed. In many areas, they are unafraid of humans. They used to be found on occasion in Pakistan, but have not been seen there since the late 1980s. Estimates of the global population have assumed that, due to expansion of agriculture, the population in 2000 was at best about 10% and at the worst just 2.5% of the numbers that existed in 1850. This assumption has been challenged and evidence shows that the population of Sarus cranes increased greatly during and after the Green Revolution in India when a large number of irrigation canals were constructed, which in turn supports both increased breeding and spreading of Sarus cranes. Additionally, emerging evidence from both Nepal and India show agriculture to be conducive for Sarus crane breeding contrary to the unsubstantiated assumptions made while suggesting population declines. Many farmers in India believe that these cranes damage standing crops, particularly rice, although studies show that direct feeding on rice grains resulted in losses amounting to less than 1% and trampling could account for grain loss around 0.4–15 kilograms (0.88–33.07 lb). The attitude of farmers tends to be positive in spite of these damages, and this has helped in conserving the species within agricultural areas. The role of rice paddies and associated irrigation structures may be particularly important for the birds' conservation, considering that natural wetlands are increasingly threatened by human activity. The conversion of wetlands to farmland, and farmland to more urban uses are major causes for habitat loss and long-term population decline. Compensating farmers for crop losses has been suggested as a helpful measure, but needs to be implemented judiciously so as not to corrupt and remove existing local traditions of tolerance. Farmers in Sarus crane wintering areas in Australia are beginning to use efficient methods to harvest crops, which may lead to lowered food availability. Farmers are also transitioning from field crops to perennial and tree crops that have higher returns. This may reduce available foraging habitat for cranes, and may increase conflict with farmers in the remaining crop fields.

Literature pertaining to the abundance of Sarus cranes in Nepal suggests that past field methods were either inadequate or incomplete, and could not yield proper abundance estimates, and that the population of cranes in Nepal might be on the increase. The Australian population is greater than 5,000 birds with record breeding success estimates that suggest that their population might be increasing. The Southeast Asian population, however, has been decimated by war and habitat change (such as intensive agriculture, deforestation, and draining of wetlands), and by the mid-20th century, had disappeared from large parts of its range, which once stretched north to southern China. Recent surveys and detailed field work in Myanmar has shown the breeding population and breeding success to be high indicating that population estimates for south-east Asia require to be revised upwards of the existing estimate of 500–1,500. Multiple institutions are now working in Myanmar alongside farmers, nature clubs, and other enthusiasts to increase awareness on Sarus Crane conservation, and to monitor critical aspects of ecology of the species such as breeding success and mapping distributions. The situation in Myanmar appears to be similar to India and Nepal where farming cycles and farmer attitudes are conducive to Sarus Cranes, with healthy populations being widespread in both locations.

Payment to locals to guard nests and help increase breeding success has been attempted in northern Cambodia. Nest success of protected nests was significantly higher than that of unprotected nests, and positive population-level impacts were apparent. However, the program also caused local jealousies leading to deliberate disturbance of nests, and did nothing to alleviate larger-scale and more permanent threats due to habitat losses leading to the conclusion that such payment-for-conservation programs are at best a short-term complement, and not a substitute, to more permanent interventions that include habitat preservation. The little-known Philippine population became extinct in the late-1960s.

The sarus crane is classified as vulnerable on the IUCN Red List. Threats listed include habitat destruction and/or degradation, hunting and collecting, and environmental pollution, and possibly diseases or competing species. The effects of inbreeding in the Australian population, once thought to be a significant threat due to hybridization with brolgas producing hybrid birds called "sarolgas," is now confirmed to be minimal, suggesting that it is not a major threat. New plans for developing the floodplain areas of northern Queensland may have detrimental impacts on breeding sarus crane population, and require consideration of the needs of cranes, such conservation of a diversity of habitats that are currently found in the region. Emerging evidence from south Asia (Nepal and India), Myanmar and Australia suggests that the species is likely not as threatened as assumed before, and that human activities in these countries (floodplain, small-holder farming and cattle raising) supports a substantial and healthy breeding population of Sarus Cranes.

The species has been extirpated in Malaysia and the Philippines. Reintroduction programs in Thailand have made use of birds from Cambodia. As of 2019, attempts to reintroduce the birds to eastern Thailand have shown some promise.

== In culture ==
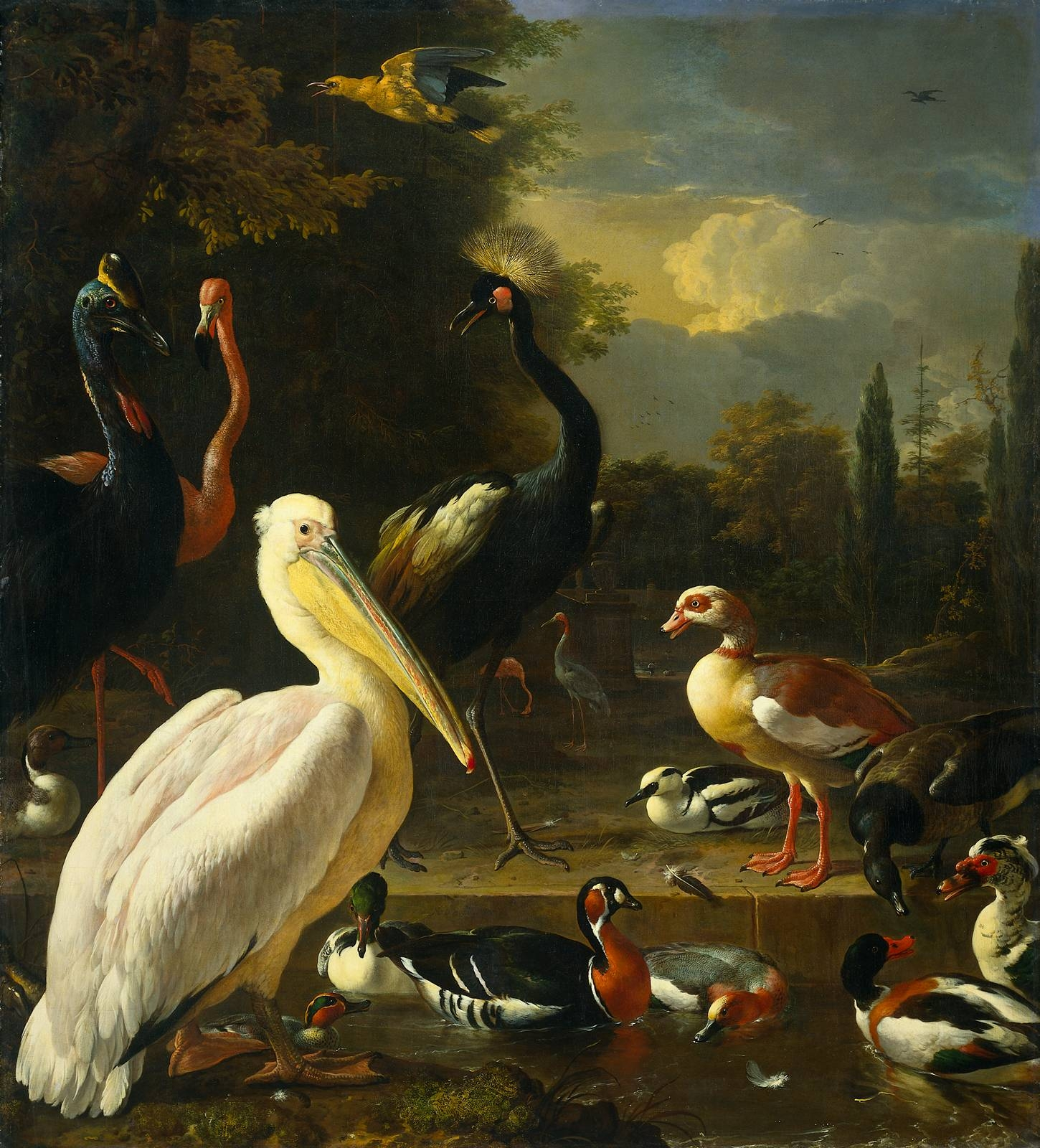
The Floating Feather, a painting by Melchior d'Hondecoeter (circa 1680) of the birds in the menagerie of William III of England at the Het Loo Palace showing a sarus crane in the background

The species is venerated in India, and legend has it that the poet Valmiki cursed a hunter for killing a sarus crane and was then inspired to write the epic Ramayana. The species was a close contender to the Indian peafowl as the national bird of India. Among the Gondi people, the tribes classified as "five-god worshippers" consider the sarus crane as sacred. The meat of the sarus was considered taboo in ancient Hindu scriptures. The sarus crane is widely thought to pair for life, and death of one partner is thought to lead to the other pining to death. They are a symbol of marital virtue and in parts of Gujarat, taking a newlywed couple to see a pair of sarus cranes is customary.

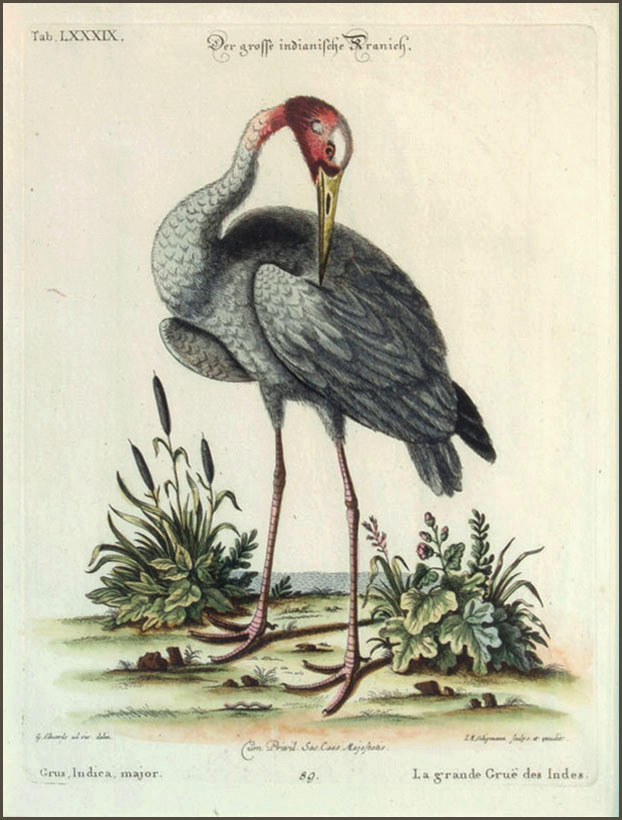
A plate by Johann Michael Seligmann published between 1749 and 1776 based on a work by George Edwards

Although venerated and protected by Indians, these birds were hunted during the colonial period. Killing a bird would lead to its surviving partner trumpeting for many days, and the other was traditionally believed to starve to death. Even sport-hunting guides discouraged shooting these birds. According to 19th-century British zoologist Thomas C. Jerdon, young birds were good to eat, while older ones were "worthless for the table." Eggs of the sarus crane are, however, used in folk remedies in some parts of India.

Young birds were often captured and kept in menageries, both in India and in Europe in former times. They were also successfully bred in captivity early in the 17th century by Emperor Jehangir, who noted that the eggs were laid with an interval of two days, and the incubation period lasted 34 days. They were also bred in zoos in Europe and the United States in the early 1930s.

The young birds are easily reared by hand, and become very tame and attached to the person who feeds them, following him like a dog. They are very amusing birds, going through the most grotesque dances and antics, and are well worth keeping in captivity. One which I kept, when bread and milk was given to him, would take the bread out of the milk, and wash it in his pan of water before eating it. This bird, which was taken out of the King's palace at Lucknow, was very fierce towards strangers and dogs, especially if they were afraid of him. He was very noisy—the only bad habit he possessed

— Irby, 1861

The Indian state of Uttar Pradesh declared the sarus crane as its official state bird in 2013. An Indian 14-seater propeller aircraft, the Saras, is named after this crane.

== Other sources ==
- Matthiessen, Peter & Bateman, Robert (2001). The Birds of Heaven: Travels with Cranes. North Point Press, New York. ISBN 0-374-19944-2
- Weitzman, Martin L. (1993). "What to preserve? An application of diversity theory to crane conservation". The Quarterly Journal of Economics. 108 (1): 157–183. doi:10.2307/2118499. hdl:10.2307/2118499. ISSN 0033-5533. JSTOR 2118499.
- Haigh, J. C. & Holt, P. E. (1976). "The use of the anaesthetic "CT1341" in a Sarus crane". Can Vet J. 17 (11): 291–292. PMC 1697384. PMID 974983.
- Duan, W. & Fuerst, P. A. (2001). "Isolation of a sex-Linked DNA sequence in cranes". Journal of Heredity. 92 (5): 392–397. doi:10.1093/jhered/92.5.392. PMID 11773245.
- Menon, G. K.; R. V. Shah & M. B. Jani (1980). "Observations on integumentary modifications and feathering on head and neck of the Sarus Crane, Grus antigone antigone". Pavo. 18: 10–16.
- Sundar, K. S. G. (2006). "Flock size, density and habitat selection of four large waterbirds species in an agricultural landscape in Uttar Pradesh, India: implications for management". Waterbirds. 29 (3): 365–374. doi:10.1675/1524-4695(2006)29[365:fsdahs]2.0.co;2. S2CID 198154724.
