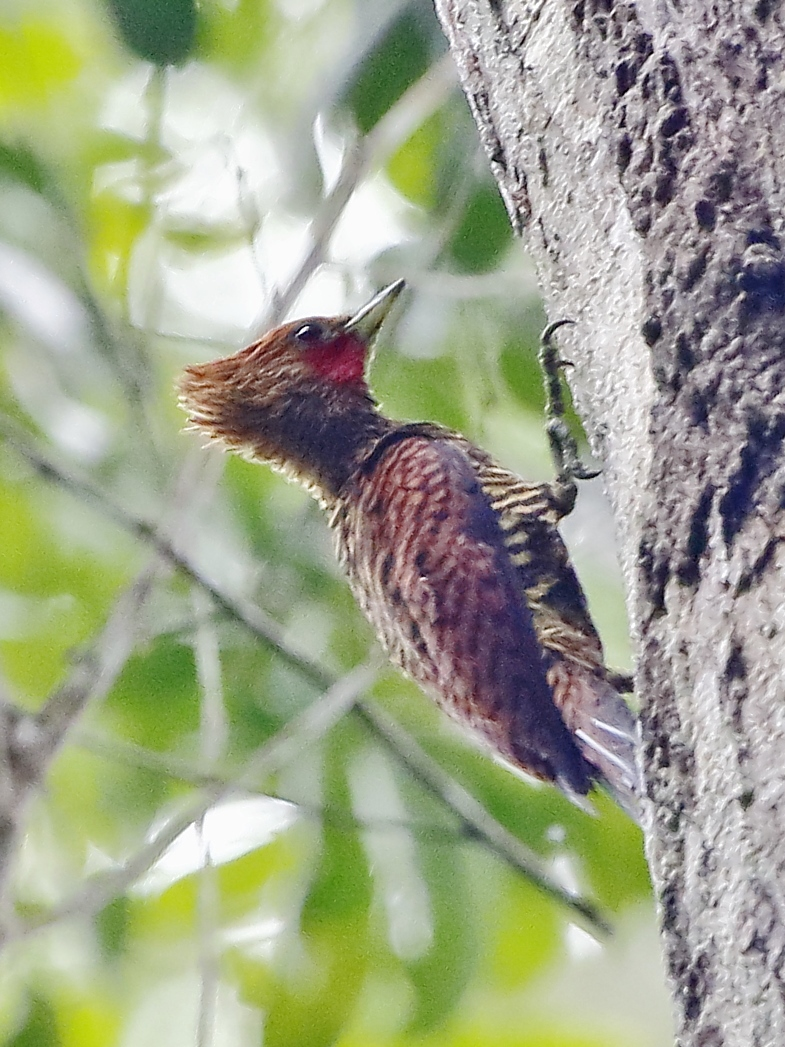
- Male
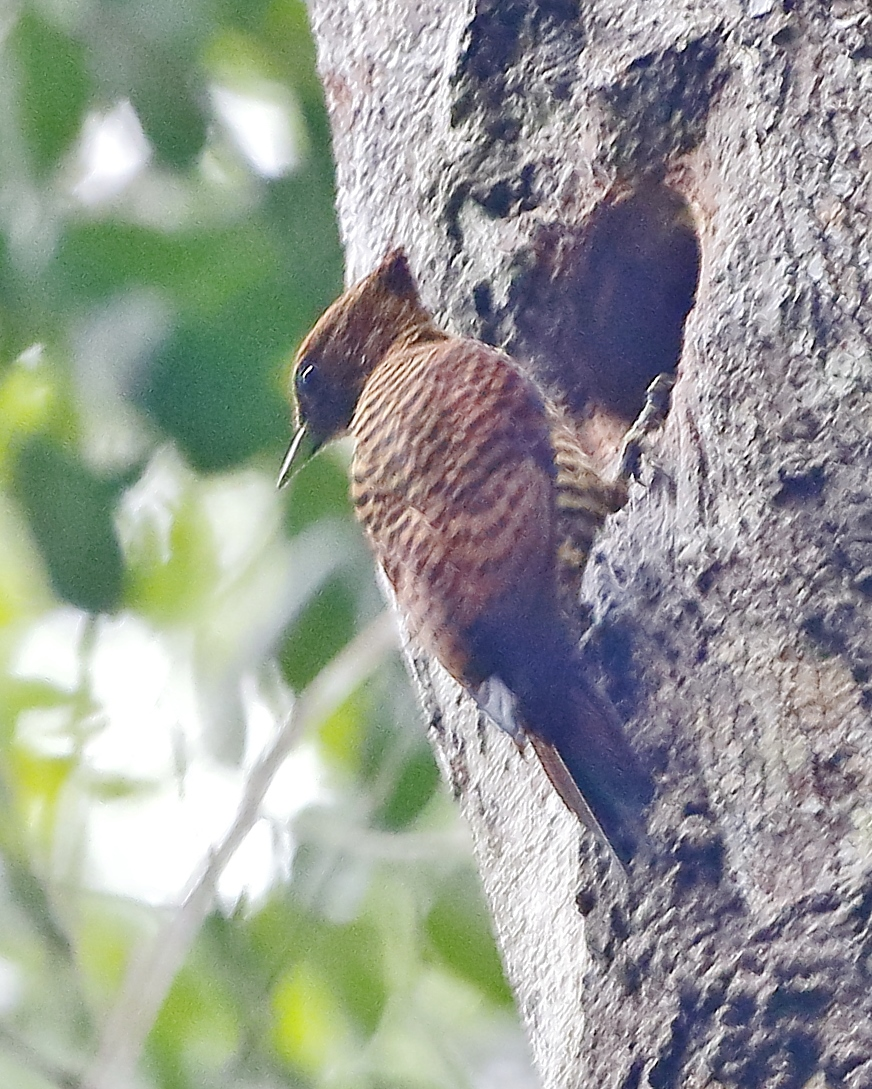
- Female at nest

Conservation status
- Least Concern (IUCN 3.1)

Scientific classification
- Kingdom: Animalia
- Phylum: Chordata
- Class: Aves
- Order: Piciformes
- Family: Picidae
- Genus: Celeus
- Species: C. undatus

Binomial name
- Celeus undatus (Linnaeus, 1766)

Subspecies
- See text

Synonyms
- Picus undatus Linnaeus, 1766

= Waved woodpecker =

Species of bird

The waved woodpecker (Celeus undatus) or variable woodpecker is a species of bird in subfamily Picinae of the woodpecker family Picidae. It is found in Bolivia, Brazil, Colombia, Ecuador, French Guiana, Guyana, Peru, Suriname, and Venezuela.

== Taxonomy and systematics ==
The English naturalist George Edwards described and illustrated the waved woodpecker in his Gleanings of Natural History which he published in 1764. Edwards used the English name "Red-cheeked Wood-pecker". When in 1766 the Swedish naturalist Carl Linnaeus updated his Systema Naturae for the twelfth edition, he included the waved woodpecker, coined the binomial name Picus undatus, and cited Edwards's book. Linnaeus specified the type locality as Surinam [sic]. The waved woodpecker is now placed in the genus Celeus that was introduced by the German zoologist Friedrich Boie in 1831.

The waved woodpecker has a complicated taxonomic history. For much of the past it was assigned three subspecies. A 2011 publication suggested that the four subspecies of the scaly-breasted woodpecker (then C. grammicus) properly belonged as subspecies of the waved woodpecker, and a 2018 publication provided further evidence. In 2019 BirdLife International's Handbook of the Birds of the World (HBW) lumped the scaly-breasted woodpecker's four subspecies into the waved woodpecker to join its existing three subspecies. In July 2023 the International Ornithological Committee (IOC) followed suit. The Clements taxonomy lumped them in late 2023 as did the South American Classification Committee of the American Ornithological Society in late 2024.

The seven subspecies resulting from the lump are:

- C. u. amacurensis Phelps & Phelps Jr, 1950
- C. u. undatus (Linnaeus, 1766)
- C. u. multifasciatus (Natterer & Malherbe, 1845)
- C. u. verreauxii (Malherbe, 1858)
- C. u. grammicus (Natterer & Malherbe, 1845)
- C. u. subcervinus Todd, 1937
- C. u. latifasciatus Seilern, 1934

The specific epithet undatus is Medieval Latin for "wavy" or "wavelike".

== Description ==
The waved woodpecker is about 23 to 26 cm (9.1 to 10.2 in) long and weighs 61 to 87 g (2.2 to 3.1 oz). In the nominate subspecies C. u. undatus, both sexes' heads are light chestnut-rufous with a bushy crest; the crest is sometimes paler with black bars, and the ear coverts and the sides of the neck have black streaks. Males have a wide red band from behind the bill to the ear coverts; females lack it. Both sexes of adults have a cinnamon-buff chin and throat with black spots or bars. They have rufous-chestnut upperparts with wide black bars, though the rump is usually paler and yellower. Their flight feathers are black with cinnamon-rufous bars. The top side of their tail is black with rufous bars and the underside similar but duller and sometimes with a yellowish tinge. Their underparts are rufous, lighter on the belly than the breast. Their breast has irregular wavy black bars and the belly and flanks more regular bars. Both sexes have some variation in the intensity of their barring, but the female's is generally heavier than the male's. The adult's shortish bill is dull yellow to yellow-green, their iris red-brown to red, and their legs green-gray. Juveniles are very similar to adults but duller overall and have lighter barring above.

Subspecies C. u. amacurensis is darker and more chestnut than the nominate. Its head is the same shade as the body rather than paler, its rump cinnamon-rufous with no yellow, its crown without barring, and all other bars narrower. C. u. multifasciatus is the largest subspecies. It is paler and more buffy than the nominate, and has streaks rather than bars on its head, often a tail without bars, and a blackish bill with a pale mandible.

Subspecies C. u. grammicus was the nominate subspecies of the former scaly-breasted woodpecker. Both sexes' heads are rufous-chestnut with a pointed crest; the crest usually has black streaks. Males have a wide red patch from behind the bill to the ear coverts; females lack it. Both sexes of adults are mostly rufous-chestnut with a pale greenish-yellow to yellow-buff rump. Their upperparts have narrow black bars that are slighter on the uppertail coverts. Their flight feathers are blackish with narrow rufous edges and pale greenish-yellow bases. The top side of their tail feathers is brown-black with chestnut edges and sometimes chestnut bases; the tail feather's undersides are brown or yellow-brown with cinnamon bases. Their underparts are rufous-chestnut with paler flanks that can be yellowish buff. Their breast has black bars and the belly sparse black spots. The adult's shortish bill is greenish to yellow-green or ivory, their iris red, and their legs dark greenish gray to gray. Juveniles are very similar to adults but their head is darker and their upperparts paler with wider bars.

Compared to C. u. grammicus, subspecies C. u. verreauxii has lighter barring on its underparts. C. u. subcervinus is more cinnamon on its rump and flanks, without a yellow tone. C. u. latifasciatus has pale cinnamon upperparts with yellow to buffish feather bases that show, and its rump is very pale. The mantle has wider bars than grammicus and the underparts are much paler.

== Distribution and habitat ==
The subspecies of the waved woodpecker are found thus:

- C. u. amacurensis, northeastern Venezuela's Delta Amacuro state
- C. u. undatus, eastern Venezuela, Guyana, Suriname, French Guiana and northeastern Brazil north of the Amazon and west of the Rio Negro
- C. u. multifasciatus, northeastern Brazil south of the Amazon between central Pará and Maranhão
- C. u. verreauxii, from south-central Colombia into eastern Ecuador
- C. u. grammicus, from southeastern Colombia and southern Venezuela south to northeastern and eastern Peru and western Brazil as far east as the lower Rio Negro and Rio Purus; also French Guiana
- C. u. subcervinus, Brazil south of the Amazon between the Rio Purus and the Rio Tapajós and south into Mato Grosso
- C. u. latifasciatus, southeastern Peru, southwestern Brazil, and northern Bolivia

The waved woodpecker primarily inhabits a variety of wooded landscapes including the interior and edges of rainforest, terra firme and várzea forest, secondary forest, and treed savannah. In most of its range it occurs between 100 and 900 m (300 and 3,000 ft) but is found locally as high as 1,140 m (3,700 ft); in Ecuador it reaches only 500 m (1,600 ft).

== Behavior ==
=== Movement ===
The waved woodpecker is a year-round resident throughout its range.

=== Feeding ===
The waved woodpecker's primary food is ants and termites; it also eats sap, seeds, fruits, and berries. It usually forages singly, in pairs, or in small family groups, but does join mixed-species feeding flocks. In the forest interior it forages on tree trunks, branches, and vines from the mid-level to the canopy. It captures prey by pecking, probing, and gleaning.

=== Breeding ===
The waved woodpecker breeds between late February and April in Venezuela, between late May and August in the Guianas, and possibly earlier and later in Brazil. It excavates the nest cavity in a living or dead tree, typically between 4 and 30 m (10 and 100 ft) above the ground. The clutch size, incubation period, time to fledging, and details of parental care are not known.

=== Vocal and non-vocal sounds ===
The song of the original (three subspecies) waved woodpecker is a "high, nasal, 'fuweét-eeuh'." It also makes a "soft, whispered 'kowahair', rising in pitch". Both sexes drum. The "scaly-breasted" woodpecker's most common vocalizations have been rendered as "curry-kuuu", "doit-gua", "wuwee? kuuu", and "fuweét-tjeeuh"; the first syllable rises and the second falls. It also makes "very loud and metallic 'pring-pring!' notes".

== Status ==
The IUCN has assessed the waved woodpecker as being of Least concerned. It has a very large range, but its population size is not known and is believed to be decreasing through habitat loss due to deforestation for agriculture and ranching. The waved woodpecker is uncommon and poorly known; it does occur in some protected areas.
