= David Durand =

David Durand may refer to:

- David Durand (historian) (1680–1763), Huguenot French and English minister and historian
- David Durand (actor) (1920–1998), American juvenile actor
