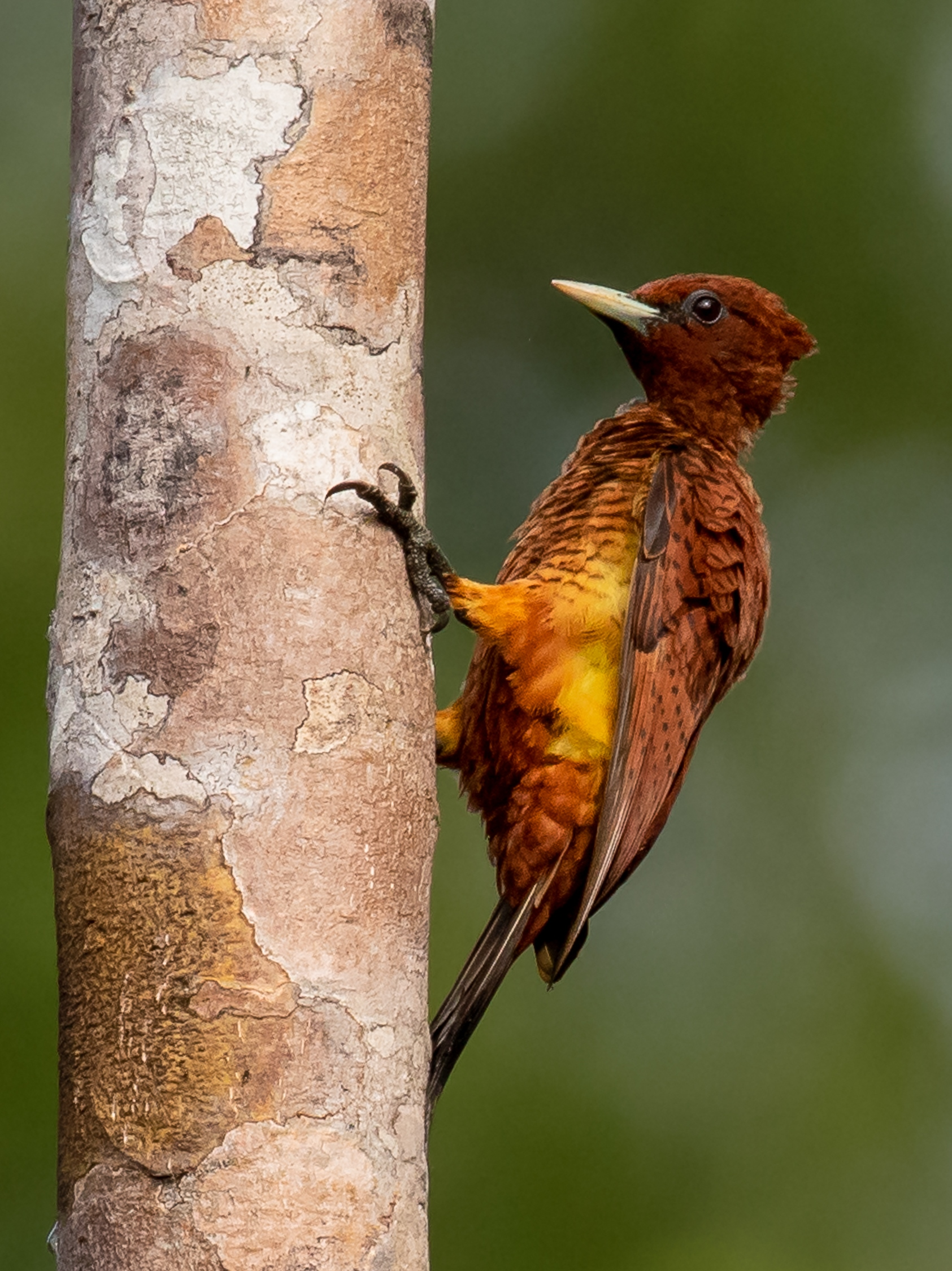
- Female at Manacapuru, Amazonas state, Brazil

Conservation status
- Least Concern (IUCN 3.1)(but see the Taxonomy and Status sections)

Scientific classification
- Kingdom: Animalia
- Phylum: Chordata
- Class: Aves
- Order: Piciformes
- Family: Picidae
- Genus: Celeus
- Species: C. undatus
- Subspecies: C. u. grammicus

Trinomial name
- Celeus undatus grammicus (Natterer & Malherbe, 1845)

= Scaly-breasted woodpecker =

Species of bird

The scaly-breasted woodpecker (Celeus undatus grammicus), also known as the scale-breasted woodpecker, is a subspecies complex of bird in subfamily Picinae of the woodpecker family Picidae. It is found in Bolivia, Brazil, Colombia, Ecuador, Peru, and Venezuela.

== Taxonomy and systematics ==
The scaly-breasted woodpecker has a complicated taxonomic history. It was long treated as a species with the binomial Celeus grammicus and the below four subspecies. A 2011 publication suggested that they properly belonged as subspecies of the waved woodpecker (C. undatus), and a 2018 publication provided further evidence. In 2019 BirdLife International's Handbook of the Birds of the World (HBW) moved the four to the waved woodpecker to join its existing three subspecies. In July 2023 the International Ornithological Committee (IOC) followed suit. The Clements taxonomy lumped them in late 2023 as did the South American Classification Committee of the American Ornithological Society (SACC) in late 2024.

The four subspecies are:

- C. u. verreauxii (Malherbe, 1858)
- C. u. grammicus (Natterer & Malherbe, 1845)
- C. u. subcervinus Todd, 1937
- C. u. latifasciatus Seilern, 1934

This article follows the separate species, four-subspecies, model.

== Description ==
The scaly-breasted woodpecker is about 23 to 26 cm (9.1 to 10 in) long. The nominate subspecies C. u. grammicus weighs 63 to 75 g (2.2 to 2.6 oz), C. u. verreauxii weighs 63 to 75 g (2.2 to 2.6 oz), and C. u. latifasciatus weighs 63 to 75 g (2.2 to 2.6 oz).

In the nominate subspecies, both sexes' heads are rufous-chestnut with a pointed crest; the crest usually has black streaks. Males have a wide red patch from behind the bill to the ear coverts; females lack it. Both sexes of adults are mostly rufous-chestnut with a pale greenish-yellow to yellow-buff rump. Their upperparts have narrow black bars that are slighter on the uppertail coverts. Their flight feathers are blackish with narrow rufous edges and pale greenish-yellow bases. The top side of their tail feathers is brown-black with chestnut edges and sometimes chestnut bases; the tail feather's undersides are brown or yellow-brown with cinnamon bases. Their underparts are rufous-chestnut with paler flanks that can be yellowish buff. Their breast has black bars and the belly sparse black spots. The adult's shortish bill is greenish to yellow-green or ivory, their iris red, and their legs dark greenish gray to gray. Juveniles are very similar to adults but their head is darker and their upperparts paler with wider bars.

Subspecies C. u. verreauxii has lighter barring on its underparts than the nominate. C. u. subcervinus is more cinnamon on its rump and flanks than the nominate, without a yellow tone. C. u. latifasciatus has pale cinnamon upperparts with yellow to buffish feather bases that show, and its rump is very pale. The mantle has wider bars than the nominate and the underparts are much paler.

== Distribution and habitat ==
The subspecies of the scaly-breasted woodpecker are found thus:

- C. u. verreauxii, from south-central Colombia into eastern Ecuador
- C. u. grammicus, from southeastern Colombia and southern Venezuela south to northeastern and eastern Peru and western Brazil as far east as the lower Rio Negro and Rio Purus; also French Guiana
- C. u. subcervinus, Brazil south of the Amazon between the Rio Purus and the Rio Tapajós and south into Mato Grosso
- C. u. latifasciatus, southeastern Peru, southwestern Brazil, and northern Bolivia

The scaly-breasted woodpecker inhabits a variety of wooded landscapes including the interior and edges of rainforest, terra firme and várzea forest, secondary forest, and treed savannah. In most of its range it occurs between 100 and 900 m (300 and 3,000 ft) but is found locally as high as 1,140 m (3,700 ft); in Ecuador it reaches only 500 m (1,600 ft).

== Behavior ==
=== Movement ===
The scaly-breasted woodpecker is a year-round resident throughout its range.

=== Feeding ===
The scaly-breasted woodpecker feeds on fruits, sap, and insects, especially ants. It forages on tree trunks, branches, and vines, from the tops of the canopy to the middle regions. It often forages in small family groups, and frequently joins mixed species feeding flocks. It captures prey by pecking, probing, and gleaning.

=== Breeding ===
The scaly-breasted woodpecker breeds between late February and April in Venezuela and possibly later in Brazil. Nothing else is known about its breeding biology.

=== Vocal and non-vocal sounds ===
The scaly-breasted woodpecker's most common vocalization has been rendered as "curry-kuuu", "doit-gua", "wuwee? kuuu", and "fuweét-tjeeuh"; the first syllable rises and the second falls. It also makes "very loud and metallic 'pring-pring!' notes". It does not drum often.

== Status ==
The IUCN follows HBW taxonomy and so has assessed the combined scaly-breasted and waved woodpeckers as a single species rated as being of Least Concern. Combined they have a very large range. The population size is not known and is believed to be decreasing through habitat loss due to deforestation for agriculture and ranching. The scaly-breasted woodpecker is considered from uncommon to common in various parts of its range; it occurs in several protected areas.
