= Johann Michael Seligmann =

German artist and engraver

Johann Michael Seligmann (1720–1762) was an artist and engraver from the Holy Roman Empire best known for his ornithological artwork in Sammlung verschiedener ausländischer und seltener Vögel (Collection of various foreign and rare birds) of 1749, which included plates based on the works of Mark Catesby and George Edwards. Seligmann received his initial training in engraving and art at the Nürnberger Malerakademie and some of his earlier works included the depictions of various rocks and minerals. His other works included the Opera Botanica 1754 written Konrad Gesner. Many of the copper plates that he made bear the initials JMS.
