= George Edwards (naturalist) =

English naturalist and ornithologist (1694–1773)

George Edwards FRS
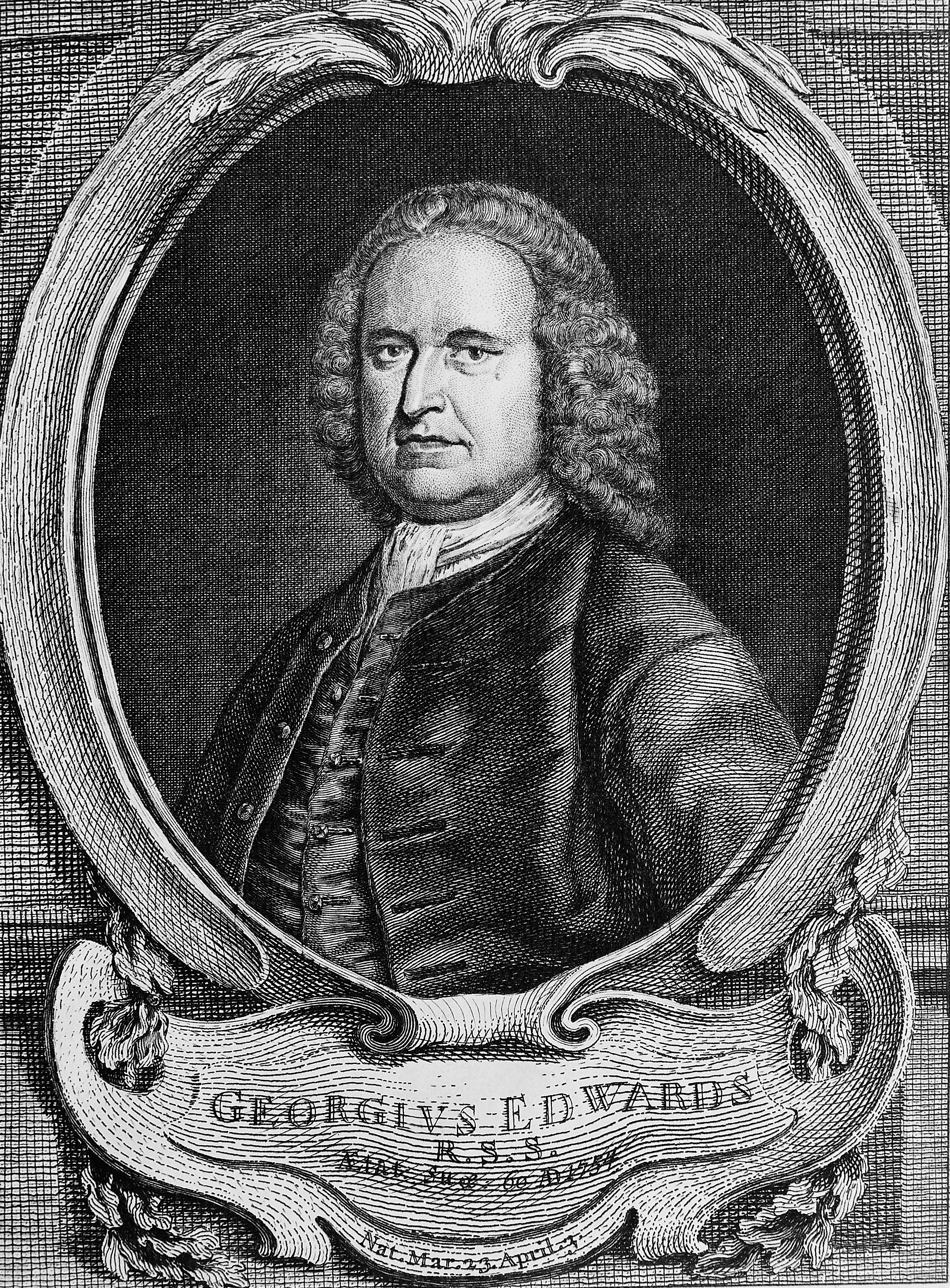
- Engraving by John Miller after a Bartholomew Dandridge portrait, 1754
- Born: 3 April 1694; West Ham, Essex
- Died: 23 July 1773 (aged 79); Plaistow, Essex
- Known for: Natural history writings and illustrations, A Natural History of Uncommon Birds
- Awards: Copley Medal of the Royal Society
- Scientific career
- Fields: Naturalist, ornithologist
- Workplaces: Royal College of Physicians

George Edwards FRS (3 April 1694 – 23 July 1773) was an English naturalist and ornithologist, known as the "father of British ornithology".

Edwards was born at West Ham, then in the county of Essex. In his early years, he travelled extensively through mainland Europe, studying natural history, and gained a reputation for his coloured drawings of animals, especially birds. He was appointed as beadle to the Royal College of Physicians in 1733.

Over a period of 21 years, Edwards published seven volumes containing descriptions and hand-coloured etchings of birds. In a few cases, he depicted other animals. None of the species were native to the British Isles. The first four volumes were published between 1743 and 1751 with the title A Natural History of Uncommon Birds. The three subsequent volumes were published between 1758 and 1764 with the title Gleanings Of Natural History. The volumes contain a total of 362 hand-coloured etchings of which 317 depict birds. The etchings were all drawn by Edwards. He numbered the plates consecutively through the seven volumes.

When the Swedish naturalist Carl Linnaeus updated his Systema Naturae for the tenth edition in 1758, he listed a binomial name for every plant and animal. For many of the birds he cited the description and illustration in A Natural History of Uncommon Birds. Later, when he updated the Systema Naturae for the 12th edition in 1766, he cited the Gleanings of Natural History.

Edwards was elected a member of the Royal Society in 1757. He never married and died aged 79 in 1773 in Plaistow, Essex.

== Early years ==
George Edwards was born on April 3, 1694, in Stratford, then a hamlet that formed part of the village of West Ham in Essex. He had two sisters, Ann and Mary, and a half-brother James Frost. When around six years of age he was sent to a boarding school in Leytonstone, after which he went to Brentwood Grammar School.

His parents wished him to train to become a merchant, and so after leaving school he was apprenticed to John Dod in Fenchurch Street, London. Dod had a large collection of various books, which Edwards read eagerly. The books inspired him to abandon his business career and to travel. In August 1716, after seven years with Dod, he left London for Holland where he spent two months visiting most of the larger cities. The next two years were spent without a job back in England.

In 1718, through a merchant friend in London, he was invited to join a ship sailing to Norway. He spent much of his two month visit in the town of Frederikshald (now Halden) which is close to the frontier with Sweden. This was during the Great Northern War, so his opportunities for travel were limited. At one point he was mistaken for a Swedish spy and arrested. He returned with the ship to Bristol and then travelled by land to London. The following year in May of 1719 he left England and travelled via Dieppe to Paris. He found the city expensive and moved to the village of Guyancourt near Versailles, 21 km (13 mi) from the centre of Paris, where he boarded with a schoolmaster. From his base in Guyancourt he made two journeys on foot. One to Châlons-en-Champagne with the son of his host and the second to Orléans and Blois dressed as a vagrant to avoid tempting robbers. After spending nearly two years in France he returned to London at the end of January 1721. In June of the same year he visited Newcastle upon Tyne with the same merchant that had taken him to Norway.

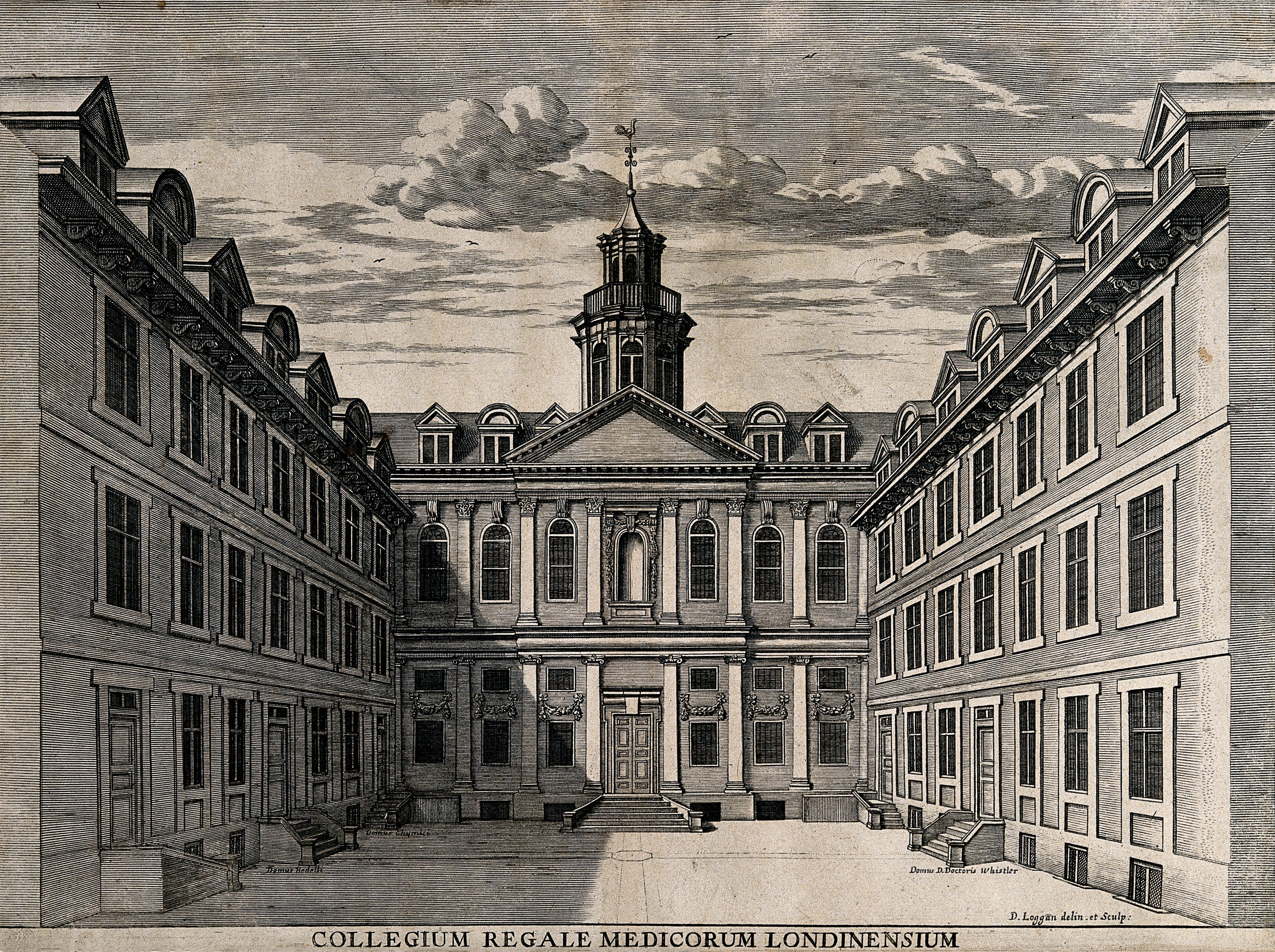
Royal College of Physicians in Warwick Lane in 1677. The entrance to the beadle's house is the second door on the left. Engraved by David Loggan.

== Beadle for the Royal College of Physicians ==
In 1733, on the recommendation of Hans Sloane, he was appointed beadle to the Royal College of Physicians in London. The beadle was the administrator of the college and the person in charge of the college property. Edwards styled himself as the "librarian" of the college; one of his duties was to take care of the library. Sir Hans Sloane, founder of the British Museum, had employed George Edwards as a natural history painter for some years, and had Edwards draw miniature figures of animals for him. Edwards visited Sloane once a week to share news and a coffee. Sloane kept track of Edwards's expenses and reimbursed him annually. He then served as college librarian for 36 years and was elected Fellow of the Royal Society and of the London Society of Antiquaries.

== Ornithology ==
In 1743 Edwards published the first volume of his A Natural History of Uncommon Birds, the fourth volume of which appeared in 1751. The title page stated: "Printed for the author, at the College of Physicians, in Warwick-Lane". The printer was probably William Bowyer of Leytonstone who was the printer used by the Society of Antiquaries and was later used by the College of Physicians. At the same time Edwards published a French edition of the book. The four parts were published in 1745, 1748, 1751 and 1751. The translator is given on the title page as "traduit de l'Anglais par M. D. de la S. R.". This was David Durand, a French protestant minister and a Fellow of the Royal Society who was living in London. Three additional volumes, under the title Gleanings of Natural History, were issued in 1758, 1760 and 1764. The two works contain etchings and descriptions of more than 600 subjects in natural history not before described or delineated. He likewise added a general index in French and English, which was afterwards supplied with Linnaean names by Linnaeus himself, with whom he corresponded.

The Royal Society awarded him the Copley Medal in 1750 with the citation: "On account of a very curious Book lately published by him, and intiyled, A Natural History of Birds, &c. - containing the Figures elegantly drawn, and illuminated in their proper colours, of 209 different Birds, and about 20 very rare Quadrupeds, Serpents." This was a significant honour. The clockmaker John Harrison had been awarded the medal the previous year for his invention of a chronometer suitable for calculating longitude while at sea. Edwards included a picture of the medal on the overall title page in the first volume of his A Natural History of Uncommon Birds and an explanation in the preface.

In about 1764 he retired to Plaistow, Essex, still a rural village, where he died in 1773 at the age of 77. He also wrote Essays of Natural History (1770).

The Nuremberg engraver Johann Seligmann, realised the popular appeal of the illustrated volumes by Edwards and Mark Catesby and re-etched all 474 of the original plates. They were published with a German text in nine volumes between 1749 and 1776 with the title Sammlung verschiedener ausländischer und seltener Vögel. The German text was translated into French and published as Recueil de Divers Oiseaux Étrangers et Peu Communs, and translated into Dutch and published as Verzameling van uitlandsche en zeldzaame vogelen, benevens eenige vreemde dieren en plantgewassen: in 't Engelsch naauwkeurig beschreeven en naar 't Leven met Kleuren afgebeeld, door G. Edwards en M. Catesby.

Some of the colour plates in his Natural History of Birds were painted by Peter Paillou.

== Eponyms ==
Diadophis punctatus edwardsii, a subspecies of North American snake, is named in honor of George Edwards. The puffadder shyshark, first described by Edwards in 1760, is now named Haploblepharus edwardsii.

== Gallery ==
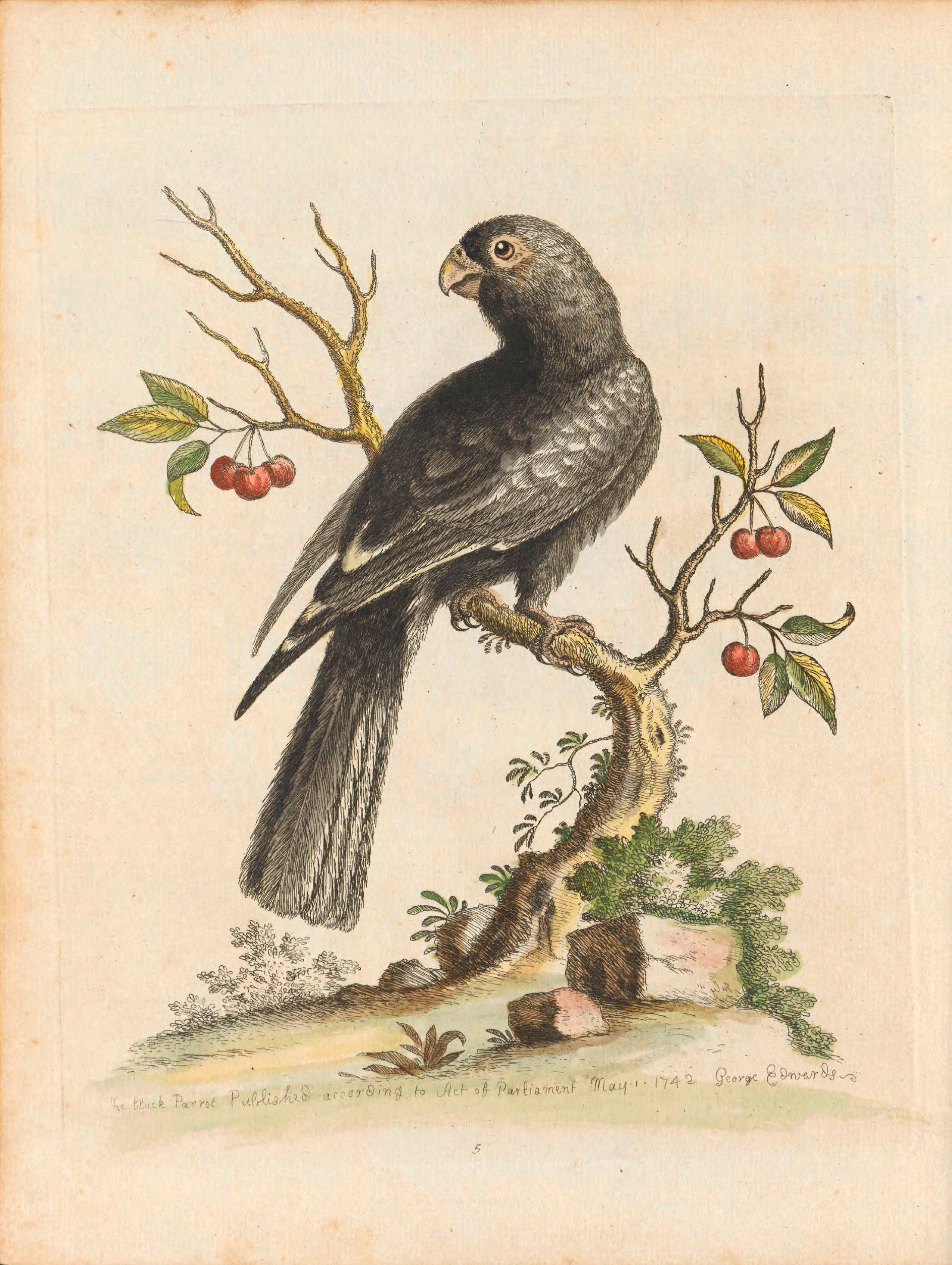
Plate 5: "The Black Parrot from Madagascar" now the lesser vasa parrot (Coracopsis nigra)

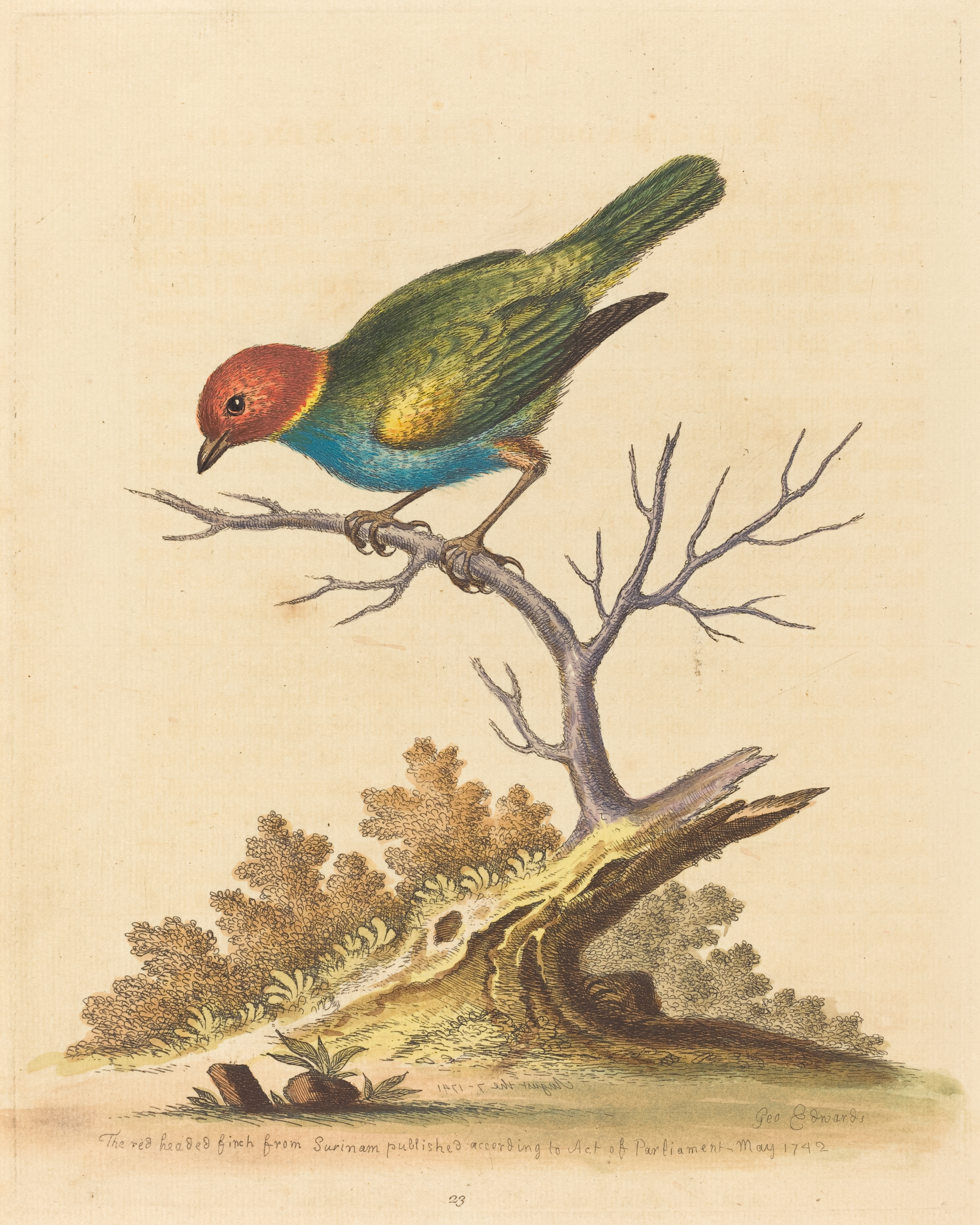
Plate 23: "The Red-Headed Green-Finch" now the bay-headed tanager (Tangara gyrola)

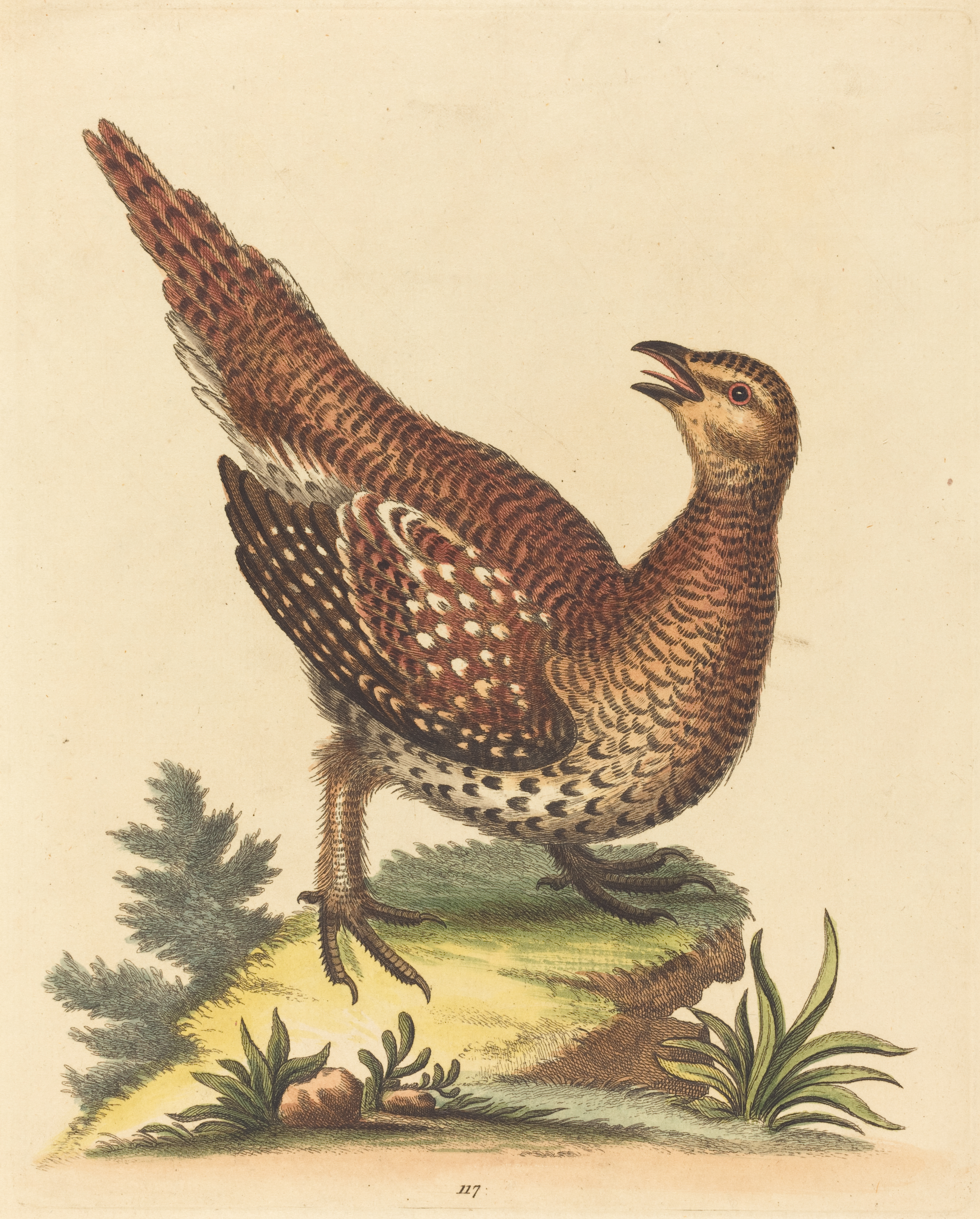
Plate 117: "The Long-tailed Grous from Hudson's-Bay" now the sharp-tailed grouse (Tympanuchus phasianellus)

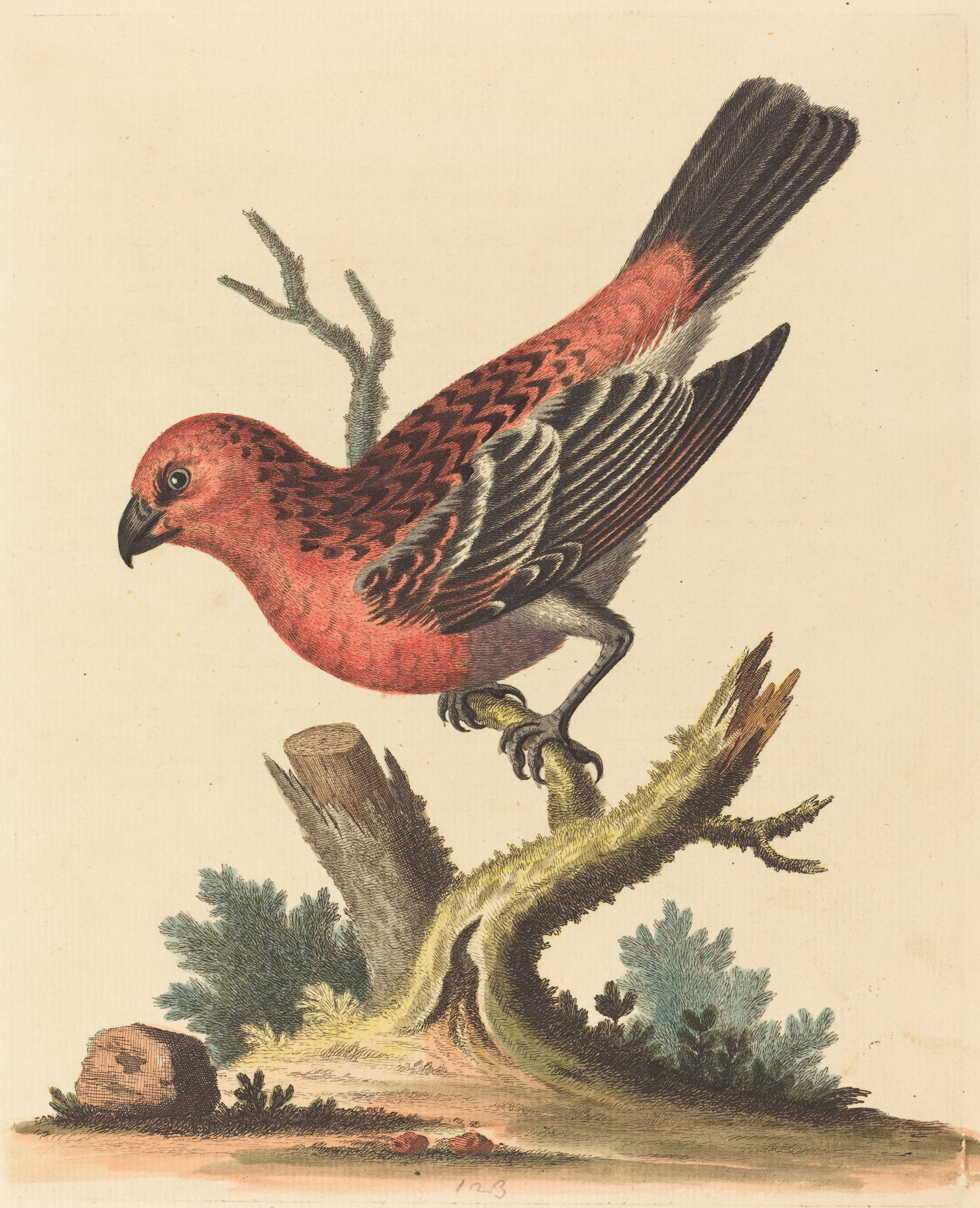
Plate 123: "The Greatest Bulfinch-Cock" now the pine grosbeak (Pinicola enucleator)

== Works ==
=== Books ===
- Edwards, George (1743). A Natural History Of Uncommon Birds : And Of Some Other Rare and Undescribed Animals. Vol. I. London: Printed for the author at the College of Physicians.
- Edwards, George (1747). A Natural History Of Uncommon Birds : And Of Some Other Rare and Undescribed Animals. Vol. II. London: Printed for the author at the College of Physicians.
- Edwards, George (1750). A Natural History Of Uncommon Birds : And Of Some Other Rare and Undescribed Animals. Vol. III. London: Printed for the author at the College of Physicians.
- Edwards, George (1751). A Natural History Of Uncommon Birds : And Of Some Other Rare and Undescribed Animals. Vol. IV. London: Printed for the author at the College of Physicians.
- Edwards, George (1745–1751). Histoire Naturelle de Divers Oiseaux (in French). Vol. I–IV. Translated by Durand, David. London: Imprimé pour l'auteur, au Collége des Medecins.
- Edwards, George (1758). Gleanings Of Natural History : Exhibiting Figures Of Quadrupeds, Birds, Insects, Plants &C., Most Of Which Have Not, Till Now, Been Either Figured Or Described (in English and French). Vol. I. London: Printed for author at the Royal College of Physicians.
- Edwards, George (1760). Gleanings Of Natural History : Exhibiting Figures Of Quadrupeds, Birds, Insects, Plants &C., Most Of Which Have Not, Till Now, Been Either Figured Or Described (in English and French). Vol. II. London: Printed for author at the Royal College of Physicians.
- Edwards, George (1764). Gleanings Of Natural History : Exhibiting Figures Of Quadrupeds, Birds, Insects, Plants &C., Most Of Which Have Not, Till Now, Been Either Figured Or Described (in English and French). Vol. III. London: Printed for author at the Royal College of Physicians.
- Edwards, George (1770). Essays upon Natural History, and other miscellaneous subjects. London: Printed for J. Robson.

=== Journal articles ===
- Edwards, George (1757). "An Account of Lacerta (Crocodilus) ventre marsupio donato, faucibus Merganseris rostrum aemulantibus". Philosophical Transactions of the Royal Society of London. 49 (2): 639–642.
- Edwards, George (1761). "An account of the frog-fish of Surinam". Philosophical Transactions of the Royal Society of London. 51 (2): 653–657.
- Edwards, George (1766). "A description of a beautiful Chinese pheasant; the feathers and drawing of which were sent from Canton to John Fothergill, M.D. F.R.S." Philosophical Transactions of the Royal Society of London. 55: 88–90.

== Sources ==
- Robson, James (1776). Some Memoirs Of The Life And Works Of George Edwards, Fellow Of The Royal And Antiquarian Societies. London: Printed for J. Robson, bookseller.
- Mason, A. Stuart (1992). George Edwards: The Bedell and his Birds. London: Royal College of Physicians. ISBN 1-873240-48-1.
