= David Durand (historian) =

David Durand (1680 – 16 January 1763) was a Huguenot French and English minister and historian. He was born in Languedoc and fled France to the Netherlands before heading to Spain with a group of refugees, being captured at the Battle of Almanza in 1707 and being sent to France and then escaping to the Netherlands again. He was a minister in Rotterdam and became a friend of Pierre Bayle's there.

He moved to England in 1711 and served as a pastor to the Church of England French-speaking churches in London. He became a Fellow of the Royal Society in 1728. During his time in England, he wrote many works in French, most of them history. His continuation of Paul de Rapin's History of England (1734) was the most successful of his works. Although it was written for a French audience, it was the most authoritative history of England for some years. He also wrote histories of the 16th century, of Classical painting, and a literary work where he attempted a French-language imitation of John Milton's Paradise Lost. He never married, and died in 1763.

== Biography ==
Born in Sommières,Languedoc, in 1680, David Durand studied theology in Basel, became a pastor in Rotterdam, then moved to London in 1711, where he was appointed pastor of the French Reformed Church of Savoy, established in 1550 by royal charter of Edward VI. He was elected a Fellow of the Royal Society on January 16, 1729.

He died in London at the age of 83, on January 16, 1763.

== Bibliography ==
- Marzials, F. T. and Geoffrey Treasure. "David Durand" In Matthew, H.C.G. and Brian Harrison, eds. The Oxford Dictionary of National Biography. vol. 17, 381. London: OUP, 2004.
