= List of cranes =

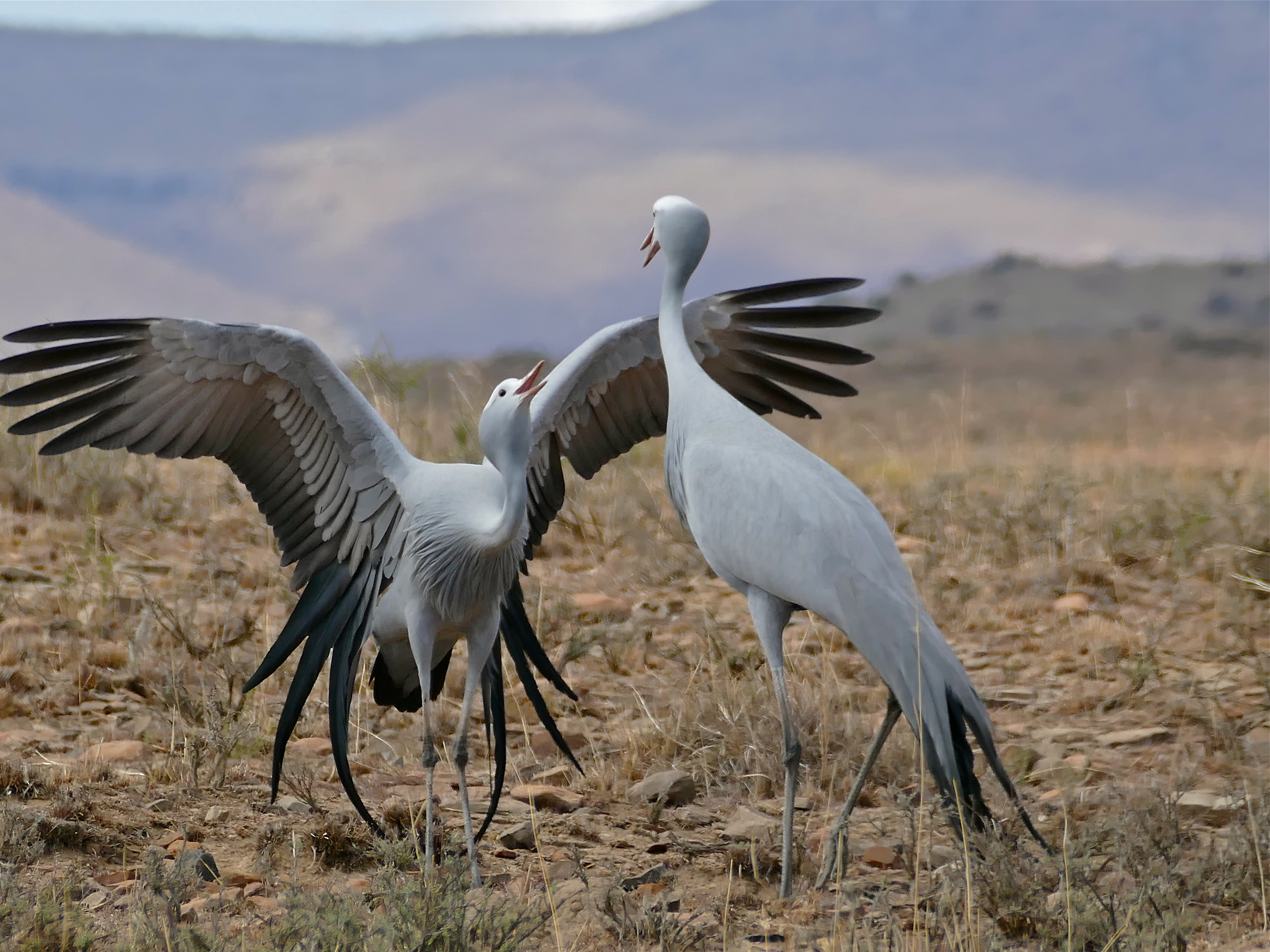
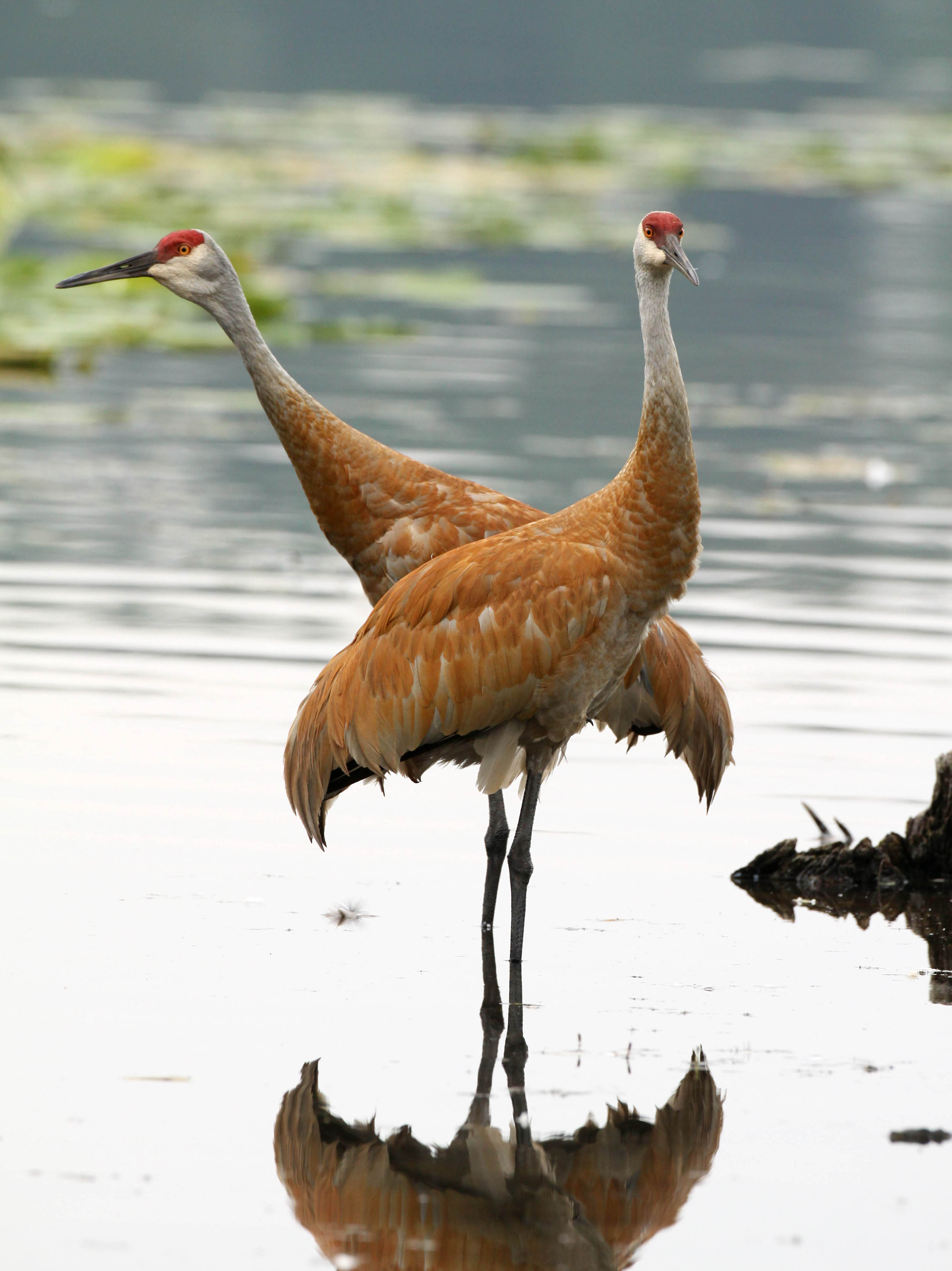
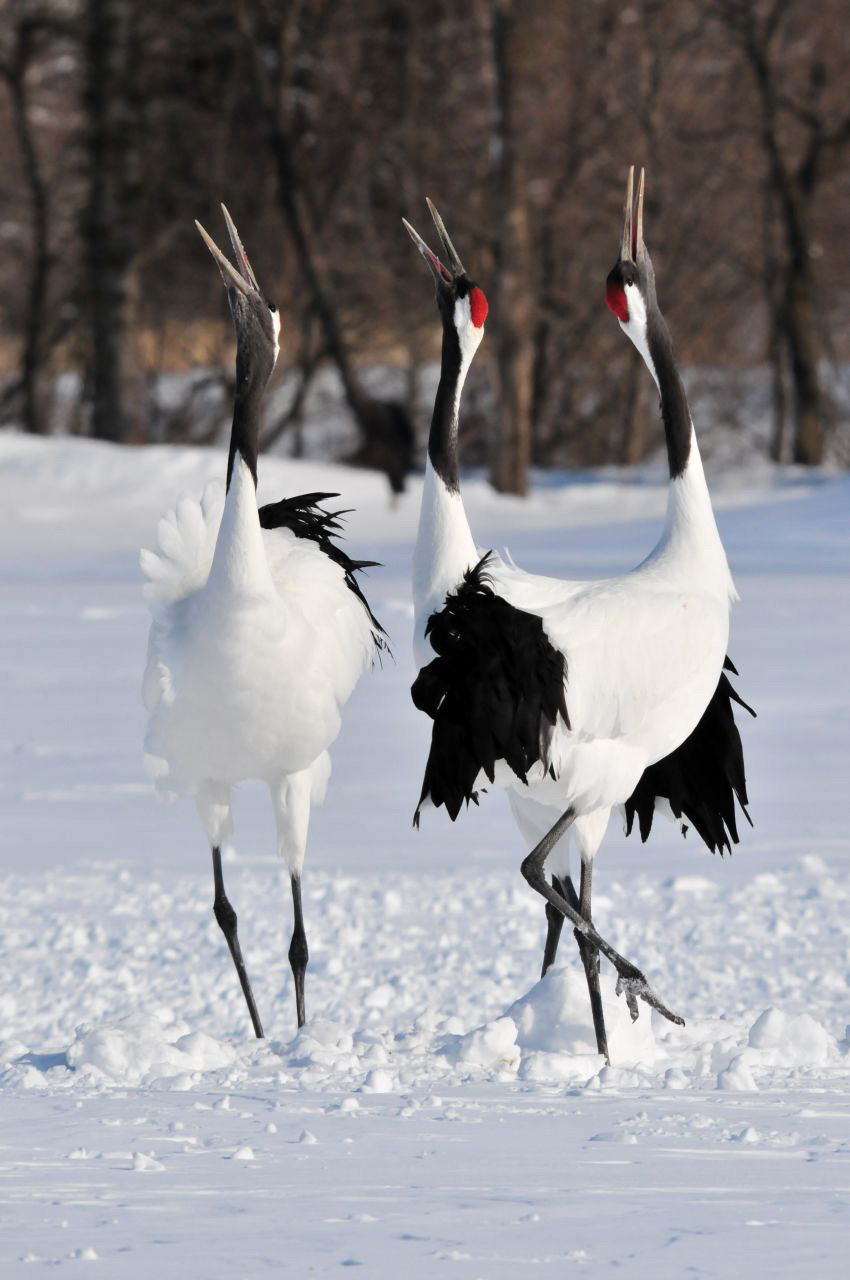
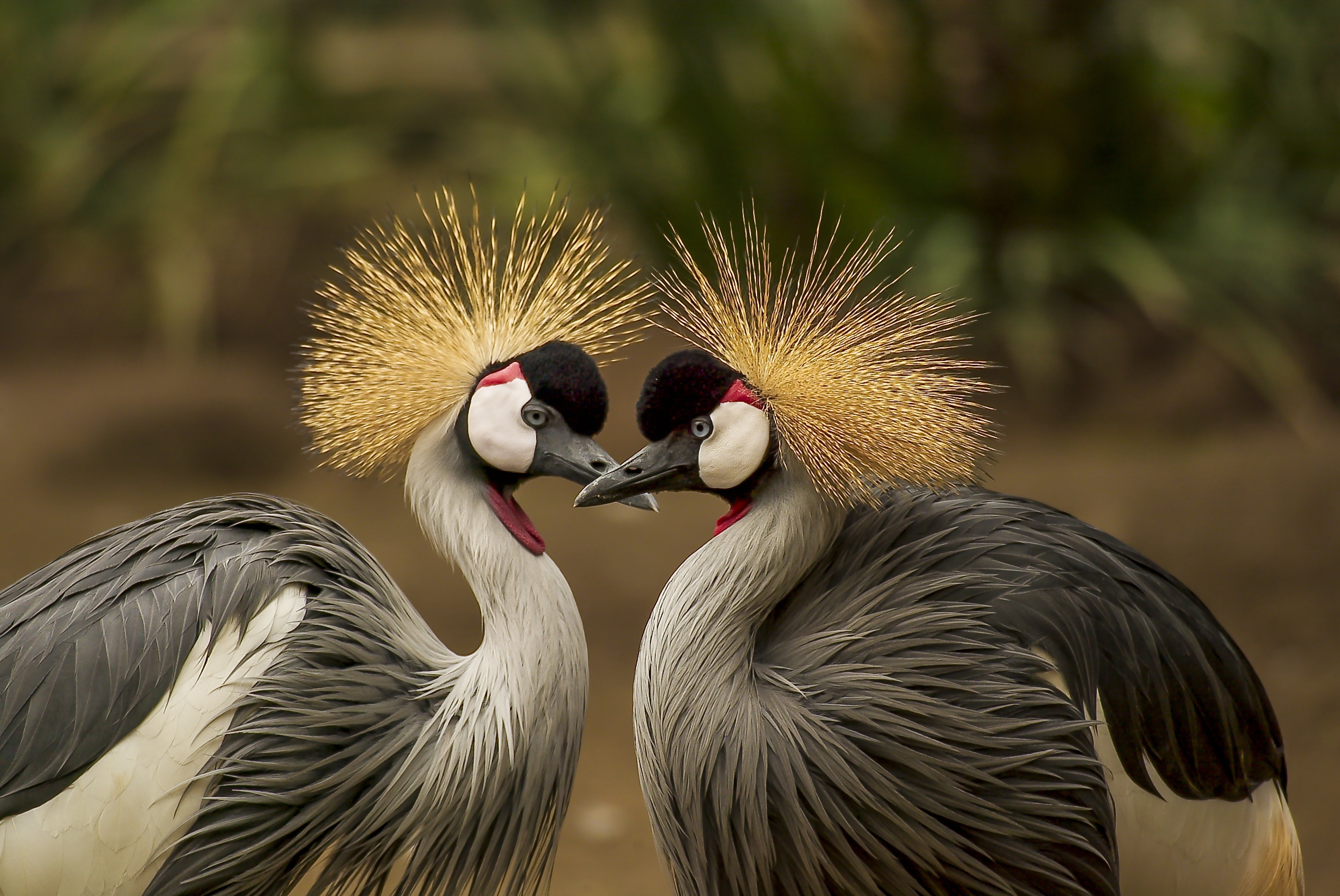
Different species of crane. Clockwise from top left: blue cranes, sandhill cranes, grey crowned cranes, and red-crowned cranes

Cranes are tall wading birds in the family Gruidae. Cranes are found on every continent except for South America and Antarctica and inhabit a variety of open habitats, although most species prefer to live near water. They are large birds with long necks and legs, a tapering form, and long secondary feathers on the wing that project over the tail. Most species have muted gray or white plumages, marked with black, and red bare patches on the face, but the crowned cranes of the genus Balearica have vibrantly-coloured wings and golden "crowns" of feathers. Cranes fly with their necks extended outwards instead of bent into an S-shape (differentiating them from the similar-looking herons) and their long legs outstretched. They also have musical, long-reaching calls and elaborate courtship displays.

Cranes are threatened by habitat loss, intentional hunting, and the wildlife trade. The Siberian crane, with an estimated population of 3,500–4,000 mature individuals, is considered critically endangered due to the construction of dams that threaten one of its main wintering grounds. Two other species are considered endangered, seven are considered vulnerable, and one is considered near-threatened. The species with the smallest estimated population is the whooping crane, which is conservatively thought to number 50–249 mature individuals, and the one with the largest is the sandhill crane, which has an estimated population of 450,000–550,000 mature individuals.

There are currently 15 extant species of crane recognised by the International Ornithologists' Union distributed among four genera. The cranes are most closely related to the family Aramidae, which contains a single extant species, the limpkin. These two families, together with the trumpeters, rails, and finfoots, comprise the order Gruiformes. Many species of fossil cranes are known from the Eocene onwards; however, their exact number and taxonomy are unsettled due to ongoing discoveries.

== Conventions ==
IUCN Red List categories
Conservation status
- EX: Extinct (0 species)
- EW: Extinct in the wild (0 species)
- CR: Critically endangered (1 species)
- EN: Endangered (2 species)
- VU: Vulnerable (7 species)
- NT: Near threatened (1 species)
- LC: Least concern (4 species)

Conservation status codes listed follow the International Union for Conservation of Nature (IUCN) Red List of Threatened Species. Range maps are provided wherever possible; if a range map is not available, a description of the crane's range is provided. Ranges are based on the IOC World Bird List for that species unless otherwise noted. Population estimates are of the number of mature individuals and are taken from the IUCN Red List.

This list follows the taxonomic treatment (designation and order of species) and nomenclature (scientific and common names) of version 13.2 of the IOC World Bird List. Where the taxonomy proposed by the IOC World Bird List conflicts with the taxonomy followed by the IUCN (Note: The IUCN follows the taxonomy proposed by the HBW and BirdLife Taxonomic Checklist.) or the 2023 edition of The Clements Checklist of Birds of the World, the disagreement is noted next to the species's common name (for nomenclatural disagreements) or scientific name (for taxonomic disagreements).

== Classification ==
The International Ornithologists' Union (IOU) recognises 15 species of cranes in four genera. This list does not include hybrid species, extinct prehistoric species, or putative species not yet accepted by the IOU. The cranes are divided into two subfamilies, which diverged from each other around 31 million years ago: Balearicinae, containing the genus Balearica, and Gruinae, containing the genera Leucogeranus, Antigone, and Grus. Grus is sometimes further divided into three distinct genera, with the wattled crane being split out as Bugeranus and the blue and demoiselle cranes being split out as Anthropoides.

- Subfamily Balearicinae
  - Genus Balearica: two species
- Subfamily Gruinae
  - Genus Leucogeranus: one species
  - Genus Antigone: four species
  - Genus Grus: eight species

- Gruidae
  - Balearica
    - Grey crowned crane (B. regulorum)
    - Black crowned crane (B. pavonina)
  - - Leucogeranus
      Siberian crane (L. leucogeranus)
    - - Antigone
        - Sandhill crane (A. canadensis)
        - - White-naped crane (A. vipio)
          - - Brolga (A. rubicunda)
            - Sarus crane (A. antigone)
      - Grus
        - - Wattled crane (G. carunculatus)
          - - Demoiselle crane (G. virgo)
            - Blue crane (G. paradisea)
        - - Red-crowned crane (G. japonensis)
          - - Whooping crane (G. americana)
            - - Common crane (G. grus)
              - - Black-necked crane (G. nigricollis)
                - Hooded crane (G. monacha)

Cladogram depicting relationships among the cranes, based on a 2021 study of genetic and behavioural data.

== Gruids ==
Genus Balearica – Brisson, 1760 – 2 species
| Common name | Scientific name and subspecies | Range | IUCN status and estimated population |
|---|---|---|---|
| Grey crowned crane | B. regulorum (Bennett, 1834) Two subspecies: B. r. gibbericeps; B. r. regulorum | Eastern and southeastern Africa | EN 17,700–22,300 |
| Black crowned crane | B. pavonina Linnaeus, 1758 Two subspecies: B. p. ceciliae; B. p. pavonina | Northern, central, and western Africa | VU 28,000–47,000 |

Genus Leucogeranus – Bonaparte, 1855 – 1 species
| Common name | Scientific name and subspecies | Range | IUCN status and estimated population |
|---|---|---|---|
| Siberian crane | L. leucogeranus (Pallas, 1773) | Northwestern Palearctic and east-central Siberia | CR 3,500–4,000 |

Genus Antigone – Reichenbach, 1853 – 4 species
| Common name | Scientific name and subspecies | Range | IUCN status and estimated population |
|---|---|---|---|
| Sandhill crane | A. canadensis (Linnaeus, 1758)) Five subspecies: A. c. canadensis; A. c. tabida; A. c. pratensis; A. c. pulla; A. c. nesiotes | North America | LC 450,000–550,000 |
| White-naped crane | A. vipio (Pallas, 1811) | Southeastern Siberia, northeastern Mongolia and northeastern China | VU 3,700–4,500 |
| Sarus crane | A. antigone (Linnaeus, 1758) Three subspecies: A. a. antigone; A. a. sharpii; A. a. gillae | Northern India, Southeast Asia, and northern Australia | VU 13,000–15,000 |
| Brolga | A. rubicunda (Perry, 1810) | Australia and south-central New Guinea | LC Unknown |

Genus Grus – Brisson, 1760 – 8 species
| Common name | Scientific name and subspecies | Range | IUCN status and estimated population |
|---|---|---|---|
| Wattled crane | G. carunculata (Note: The wattled crane is placed in the genus Bugeranus by the IUCN and Clements Checklist.) (Gmelin, J. F., 1789) | Southern and eastern Africa | VU 6,000–6,300 |
| Blue crane | G. paradisea (Note: The blue crane is placed in the genus Anthropoides by the IUCN and Clements Checklist.) (Lichtenstein, A. A. H., 1793) | Southern Africa | VU 17,000–30,000 |
| Demoiselle crane | G. virgo (Note: The Demoiselle crane is placed in the genus Anthropoides by the IUCN and Clements Checklist.) (Linnaeus, 1758) | Asia and northwestern Africa | LC 230,000–261,000 |
| Red-crowned crane | G. japonensis (Müller, P. L. S., 1776) | East Asia and Siberia | VU 2,000–2,650 |
| Whooping crane | G. americana (Linnaeus, 1758) | North America | EN 50–249 |
| Common crane | G. grus (Linnaeus, 1758) | Afro-Eurasia | LC 491,000–503,000 |
| Hooded crane | G. monacha Temminck, 1835 | Map of range | VU 6,000–15,000 |
| Black-necked crane | G. nigricollis Przevalski, 1876 | India and China | NT 6,600–6,800 |
