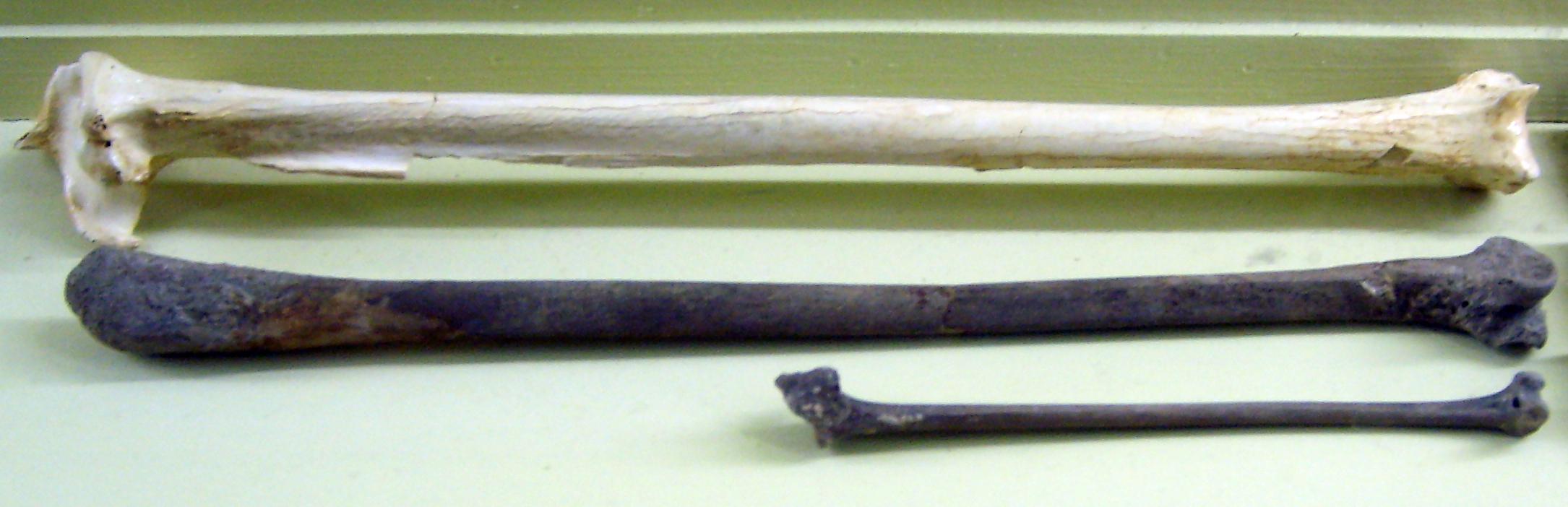
- Tibiotarsus of Antigone cubensis (top)

Scientific classification
- Kingdom: Animalia
- Phylum: Chordata
- Class: Aves
- Order: Gruiformes
- Family: Gruidae
- Genus: Antigone
- Species: †A. cubensis

Binomial name
- †Antigone cubensis (Fischer & Stephan, 1971)

Synonyms
- Grus cubensis Fischer & Stephan, 1971

= Antigone cubensis =

Antigone cubensis Temporal range: Late Pleistocene

Extinct species of crane

Antigone cubensis, sometimes called the Cuban flightless crane, is an extinct species of large crane which was endemic to the island of Cuba in the Caribbean. The species was originally placed in the genus Grus, as Grus cubensis, however subsequent study of the genus resulted in moving the species to Antigone in 2020. Subfossil remains were found in Pleistocene deposits in Pinar del Rio. Probably derived from an early invasion of sandhill cranes from North America, it differed from that species by, in addition to larger size, having a proportionately broader bill, stockier legs, and reduced wings and pectoral girdle indicating that it may have been flightless. Currently, the only extant Caribbean crane is the Cuban sandhill crane, Antigone canadensis nesiotes, an endangered subspecies of sandhill crane endemic to the country.
