= Grus pagei =

Grus pagei Temporal range: Pleistocene

Scientific classification
- Kingdom: Animalia
- Phylum: Chordata
- Class: Aves
- Order: Gruiformes
- Family: Gruidae
- Genus: Grus
- Species: G. pagei

Binomial name
- Grus pagei Campbell, 1995

Extinct species of bird

Grus pagei is an extinct crane reported from the Upper Pleistocene asphalt deposits of Rancho La Brea, Los Angeles, California. It is one of three cranes present at Rancho La Brea, the others being the still-living whooping crane (Grus americana) and the still-living sandhill crane (Antigone canadensis). It is the smallest of the three cranes, and it had a relatively longer, more slender skull than the living cranes. At least 11 individuals are represented by 42 fossil bones. Described by Kenneth E. Campbell Jr. in 1995, it was named after the philanthropist responsible for the museum at the tar pits, George C. Page.
