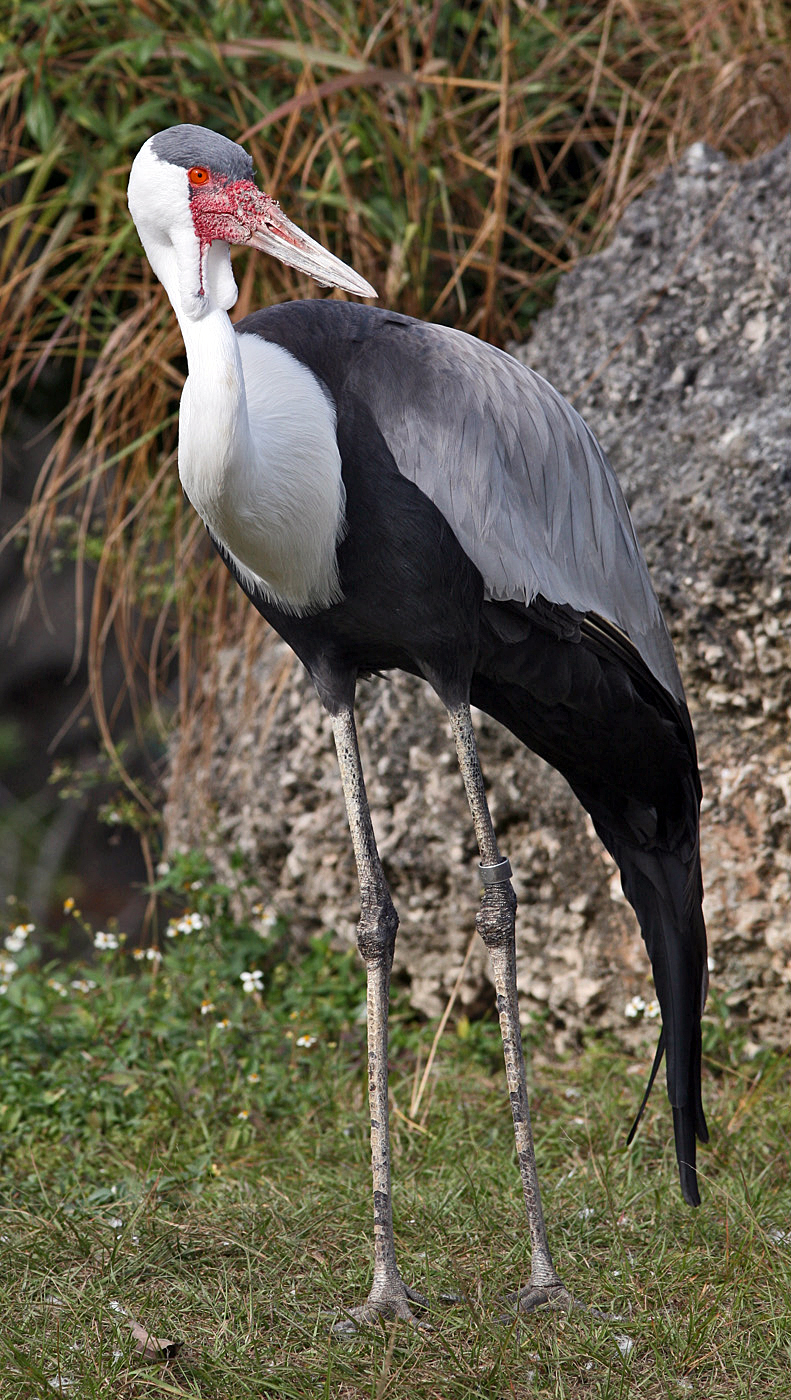

Conservation status
- Vulnerable (IUCN 3.1)
- CITES Appendix II

Scientific classification
- Kingdom: Animalia
- Phylum: Chordata
- Class: Aves
- Order: Gruiformes
- Family: Gruidae
- Genus: Grus
- Species: G. carunculata

Binomial name
- Grus carunculata (Gmelin, JF, 1789)

Synonyms
- Ardea carunculata Gmelin, 1789; Bugeranus carunculatus (Gmelin, 1789)

= Wattled crane =

Species of large bird from Africa

The wattled crane (Grus carunculata) is a large, threatened species of crane found in wetlands and grasslands of eastern and southern Africa, ranging from Ethiopia to South Africa. Some authorities consider it the sole member of the genus Bugeranus.

== Taxonomy ==
The first formal description of the wattled crane was by the German naturalist Johann Friedrich Gmelin in 1789 under the binomial name Ardea carunculata. Gmelin based his account on the "wattled heron" that had been described and illustrated by the English ornithologist John Latham in 1785. The specific epithet is from the Latin caruncula meaning "a small piece of flesh".

The wattled crane was formerly placed in its own genus Bugeranus. A molecular phylogenetic study published in 2010 found that the genus Grus within the crane family was not monophyletic and that the wattled crane was a sister species to a clade containing the blue crane and the demoiselle crane. In the resulting reorganization of the genera, the wattled crane was moved to the genus Grus. Some taxonomists retain the wattled crane within Bugeranus. The wattled crane is monotypic: there are no recognised subspecies.

== Description ==
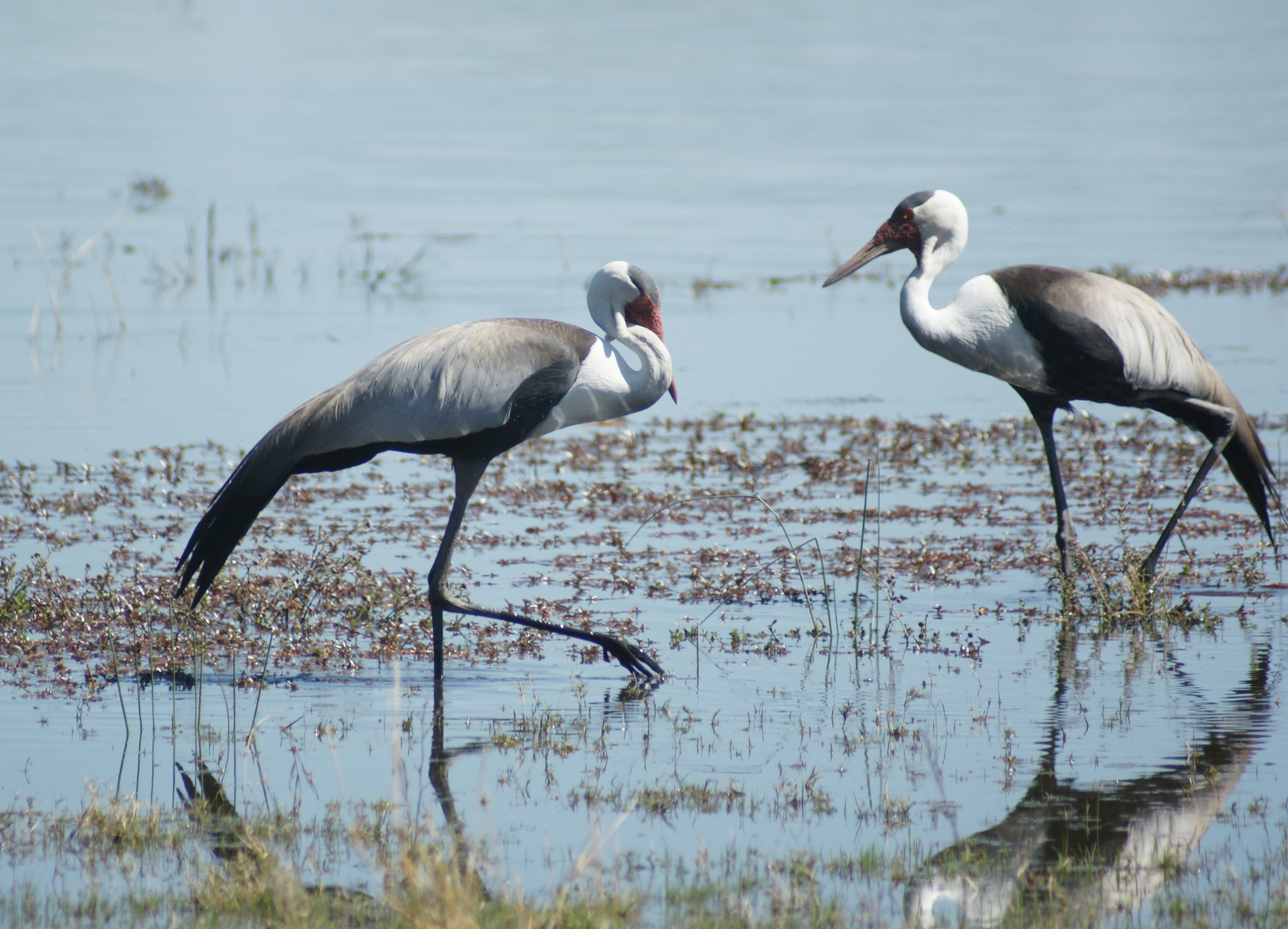
A pair foraging in Moremi Game Reserve, Botswana.

At a height known to range from 150 to 175 cm (4 ft 11 in to 5 ft 9 in), it is the largest crane in Africa and is the second tallest species of crane in the world, after the sarus crane. It is also the tallest flying bird native to Africa third only among all birds to the two species of ostrich. The wattled crane is taller and, despite the appearance of gracility imparted by its sharp but slim beak and slender neck and legs, is the heaviest on average of several very large, long-legged waders in Africa (i.e. the 2 largest African storks, shoebill, greater flamingo, goliath heron). It is also roughly the fourth heaviest African flying bird after the great white pelican, the much more sexually dimorphic kori bustard and cape vulture. The wingspan is 230–260 cm (7 ft 7 in – 8 ft 6 in), the length is typically 110 to 140 cm (3 ft 7 in to 4 ft 7 in) and weight is 6.4–8.28 kg (14.1–18.3 lb) in females and 7.5–9 kg (17–20 lb) in males. Among standard measurements, the wing chord length is 61.3–71.7 cm (24.1–28.2 in), the exposed culmen is 12.4–18.5 cm (4.9–7.3 in) and the tarsus is 23.2–34.2 cm (9.1–13.5 in). Going on standard measurements, it is the second largest proportioned crane after the sarus species, outsizing in these respects even the ostentatiously heavier red-crowned crane. Three adult wattled cranes averaged 8.15 kg (18.0 lb). The back and wings are ashy gray. The feathered portion of the head is dark slate gray above the eyes and on the crown, but is otherwise white, including the wattles, which are almost fully feathered and hang down from under the upper throat. The breast, primaries, secondaries, and tail coverts are black. The secondaries are long and nearly reach the ground. The upper breast and neck are white all the way to the face. The skin in front of the eye extending to the base of the beak and tip of the wattles is red and bare of feathers and covered by small round wart-like bumps. Wattled cranes have long bills and black legs and toes. Males and females are virtually indistinguishable, although males tend to be slightly larger. Juveniles have tawny body plumage, lack the bare skin on the face, and have less prominent wattles. The generation length (in years) is 13.

== Range ==
The wattled crane occurs in eleven countries in eastern and southern Africa, including an isolated population in the Ethiopia Highlands. More than half of the world's wattled cranes occur in Zambia, but the single largest concentration occurs in the Okavango Delta of Botswana.

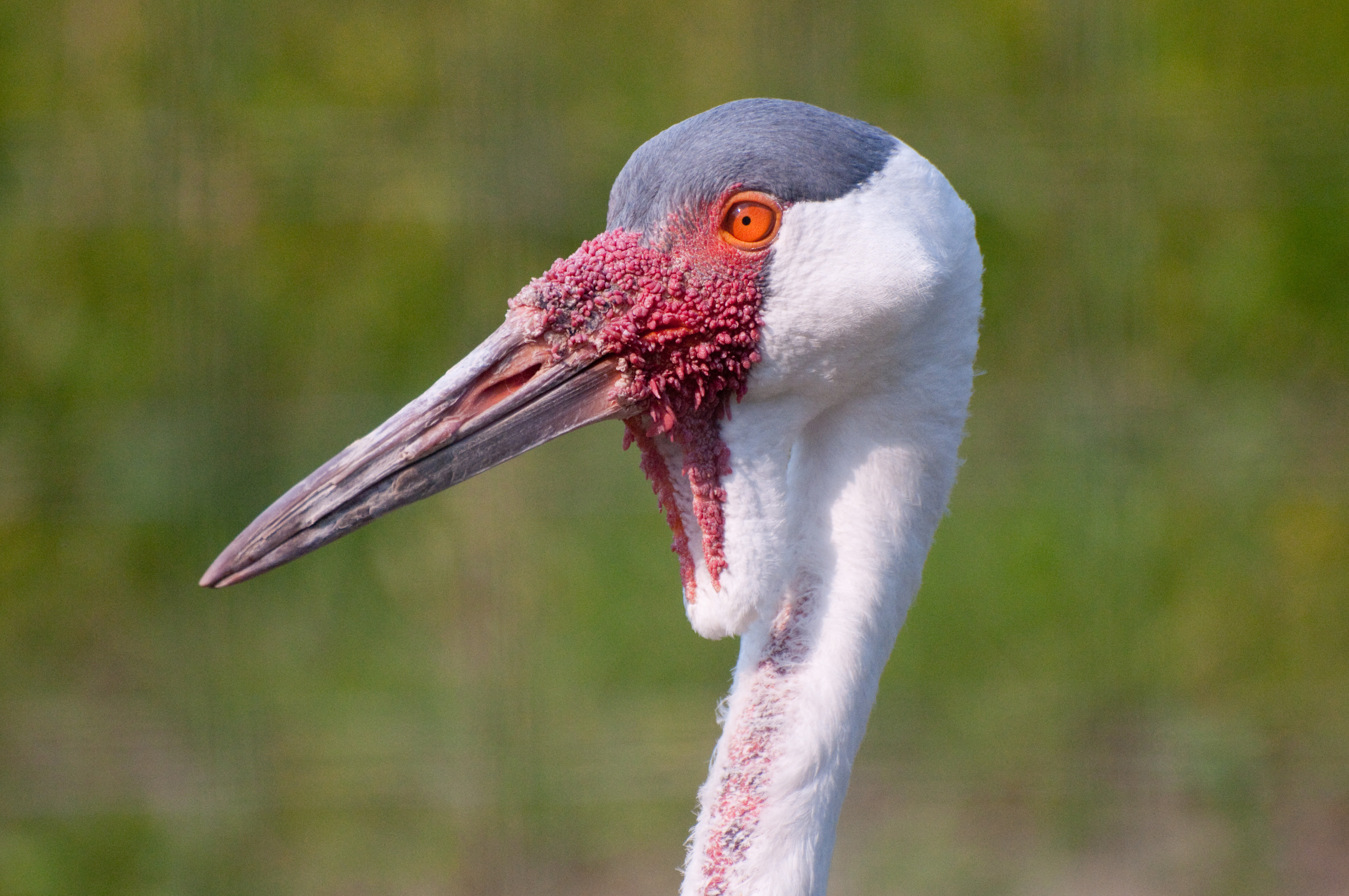
At Franklin Park Zoo, Massachusetts, USA. Portrait showing distinctive wattles

The wattled crane has been spotted in Uganda for the first time in 2011, seen in the Kibimba Rice region in the eastern side of the country. This sighting brings the total number of bird species in Uganda to 1040.

In April 2018, a new population of Wattled Cranes was discovered in Angola.

== Habitat and diet ==
Wattled cranes inhabit fairly inaccessible wetlands under most conditions. It requires shallow marsh-like habitats with a good deal of sedge-based vegetation. All cranes are omnivorous. The principal food of the wattled crane is mainly aquatic eating the tubers and rhizomes of submerged sedges and water lilies. It is one of the more herbivorous of extant cranes. The other primary portion of the diet consists of aquatic insects. They will supplement the diet with snails, amphibians and snakes when the opportunity arises. Roughly 90% of foraging done by this species occurs in shallow waters. They typically forage by digging vigorously with their bill into the muddy soil. On occasion, it will eat grain and grass seed as well, but does so much less often than the other three African crane species.

== Behavior ==
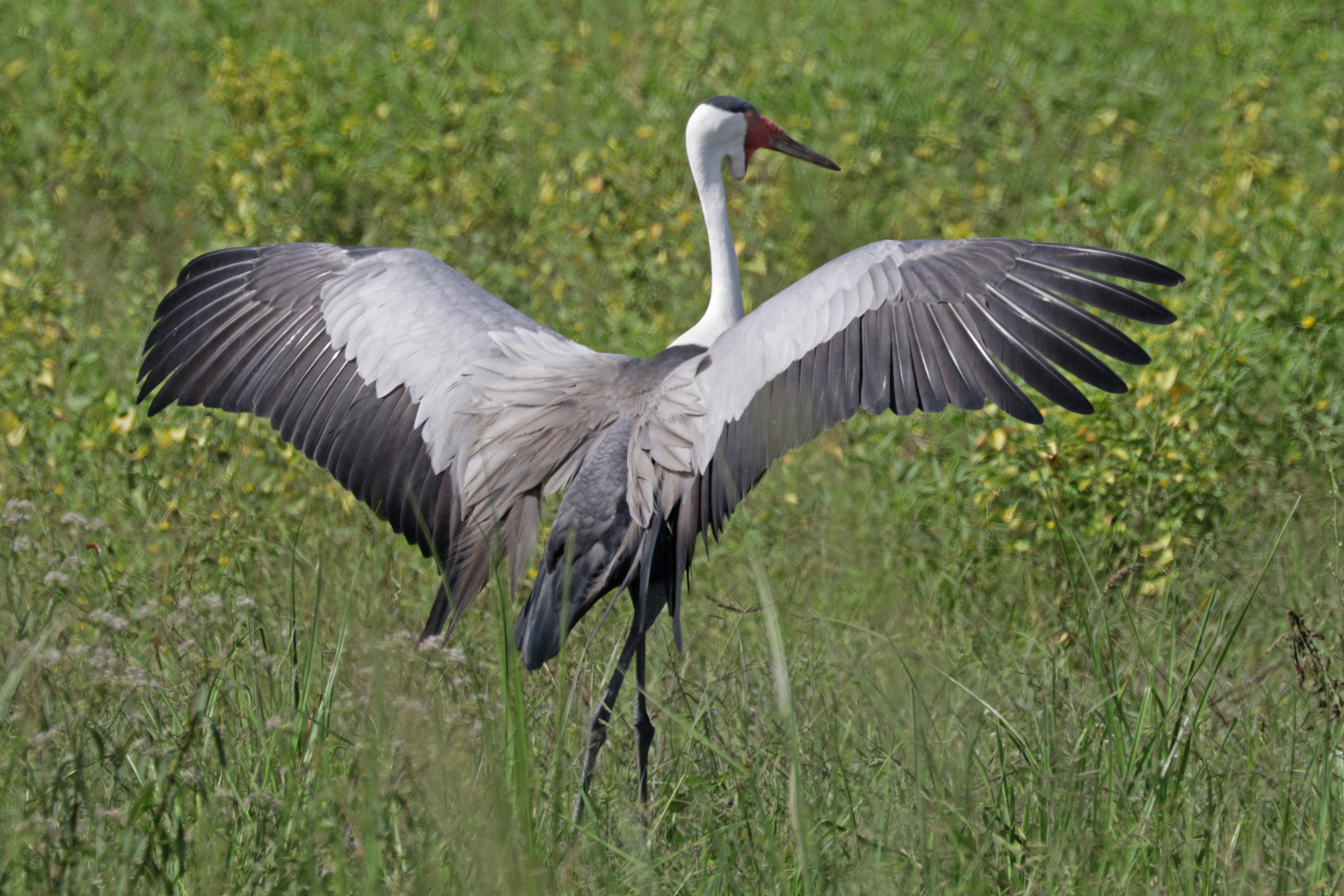
displaying wings

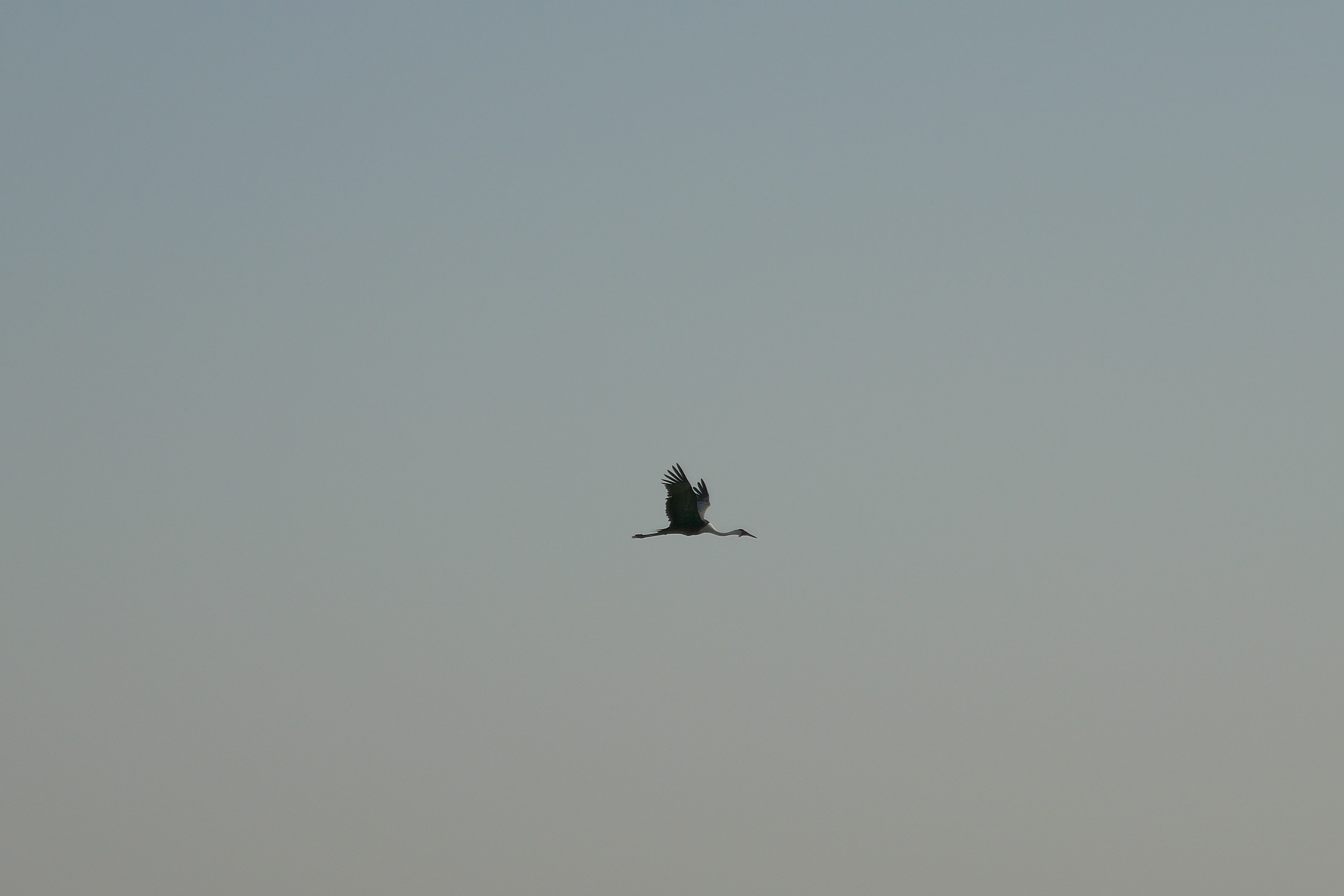
flying wattled crane

There does seem to be some seasonal movements in this crane species, but they are not well-known. Movements seem to be dictated by local water conditions rather than by seasonal temperature variations. During local floods, the number of wattled cranes can increase from almost none to as much as 3,000 individuals. These movements, in pursuit of ideal feeding conditions, seem more opportunistic movement rather than a fixed migration pattern. On the other hand, there has been observed a migration movement from the high to the low plateaus in Mozambique for the species.

Somewhat gregarious outsize of the breeding season, flocks of wattled cranes can often include 10 or more birds, occasionally as many as 89 individuals. The crowned cranes occasionally interact with this species but, given those species largely terrestrial foraging patterns, this is uncommon. Two species are known to associate closely with wattled cranes due to shared habitat and dietary preferences: the antelope known as the lechwe and the spur-winged goose, the latter nonetheless usually being found in slightly deeper waters. There is no data on significant predation on the wattled crane, as its size often insures it from being killed. Jackals may be occasional predators of chicks.

Wattled cranes commence their breeding season around April. Most nest are sloppily crushed impressions of grass along the border of a marsh. They may use an old spur-winged goose nest or make their own. Eggs are laid approximately 3 weeks after the nests are built. The average clutch size of the species is reportedly the smallest of any of the world's cranes, with an average of 1.6 eggs. Even if there are two eggs, usually only one chick successfully survives to hatch or fledge. The incubation period, roughly 33 to 36 days, is on average the longest of any crane and both parents participate. The chicks are immediately fed by both parents, which take shifts. After around 80 days, the chick(s) start to forage with their parents. At the first sign of any danger, the parents force their young into tall grasses to hide. The fledging period occurs at 100–150 days, the longest it takes any crane to fledge. The young remain with their parents for up to a year (when the next breeding period starts) and may gather in flocks with unrelated juveniles.

== Threats ==
Destruction, alteration, and degradation of wetland habitats constitute the most significant threats to the wattled crane, perhaps one of the most habitat sensitive of all cranes. Hydroelectric power projects and other water development have caused fundamental changes in the species expansive floodplain habitats, and their most important food source Eleocharis spp. Human and livestock disturbance, powerline collisions, mass aerial spraying of tsetse flies, and illegal collection of eggs, chicks and adults for food are also significant threats to wattled cranes throughout their range.

The wattled crane is one of the species to which the Agreement on the Conservation of African-Eurasian Migratory Waterbirds (AEWA) applies. It is listed as vulnerable in the IUCN Red List.
