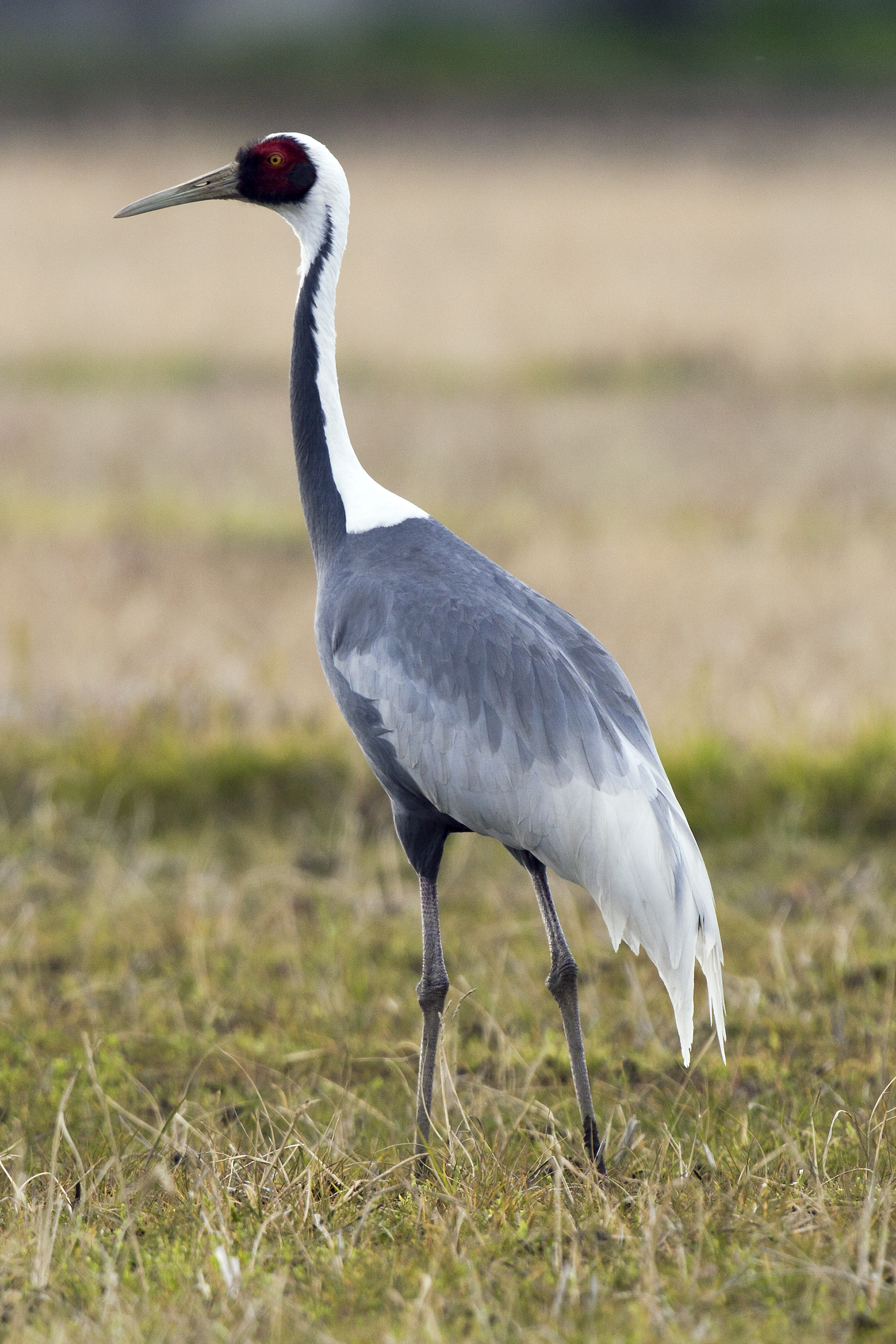
- White-naped crane in Saijō, Ehime Prefecture, Japan

Conservation status
- Vulnerable (IUCN 3.1)
- CITES Appendix I

Scientific classification
- Kingdom: Animalia
- Phylum: Chordata
- Class: Aves
- Order: Gruiformes
- Family: Gruidae
- Genus: Antigone
- Species: A. vipio

Binomial name
- Antigone vipio (Pallas, 1811)
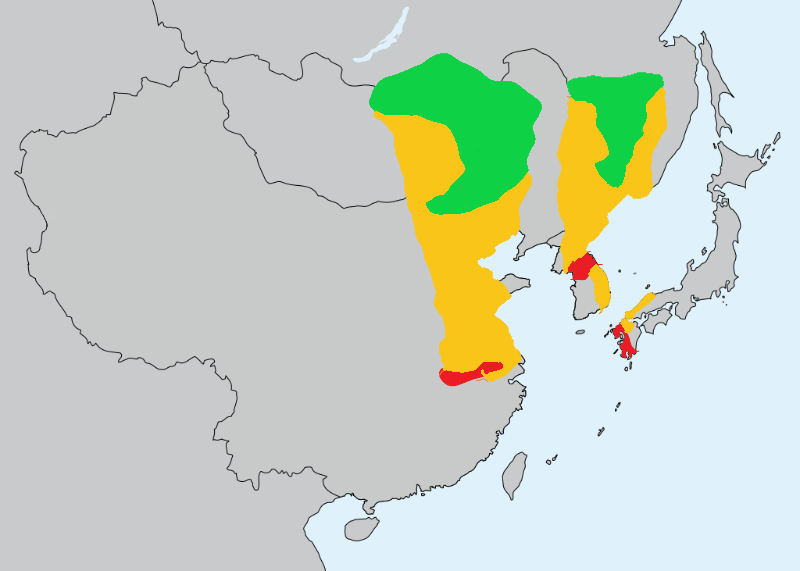
- Geographical distribution. Green: Breeding; Yellow: Migratory passage Red: Non-breeding

Synonyms
- Grus vipio

= White-naped crane =

Species of bird

The white-naped crane (Antigone vipio) is a bird in the crane family, Gruidae. It breeds in shallow wetlands and wet meadows in northeastern Mongolia, northeastern China, and adjacent areas of southeastern Russia. It is a large bird measuring 112–125 cm (44–49 in) long, about 130 cm (4.3 ft) tall, and weighing about 5.6 kg (12 lb), with pinkish legs, a grey-and-white-striped neck, and a red face patch.

== Taxonomy ==
The white-naped crane was formerly placed in the genus Grus, but a molecular phylogenetic study published in 2010 found that the genus, as then defined, was polyphyletic. In the resulting rearrangement to create monophyletic genera, four species: the sarus crane (Antigone antigone), the brolga (Antigone rubicunda), the sandhill crane (Antigone canadensis) and the white-naped crane (Antigone vipio), were placed in the resurrected genus Antigone that had originally been erected by German naturalist Ludwig Reichenbach in 1853.

== Description ==
The white-naped crane can be identified by its grey body, reddish face patch, white throat, and the white strip going from the back of its crown down its neck, or nape. Juveniles differ by having a brown head and a pale throat. While this crane does have other species in its genus with similar characteristics, it can be distinguished by the white nape that is not present in the other species.

The white-naped crane emits a variety of different calls: a growling contact call, or high pitched call at short ranges, and loud calls which differ between sexes. The loud calls include aggressive guard calls and flight intention calls.

== Distribution and habitat ==
The white-naped crane breeds in northeastern Mongolia, northeastern China, and adjacent areas of southeastern Russia, where a program at Khingan Nature Reserve raises eggs provided from U.S. zoos to bolster the species. Depending on the breeding location of the individual, they will migrate to different locations in the winter. The western breeding cranes will migrate through China to Poyang Lake while the eastern breeding individuals will migrate more south through Korea. Mongolia has been shown to hold at least 50% of the white-naped crane population.

There are two main wintering populations of this species: one that winters near the Yangtze River in China, and the other in the Korean Demilitarized Zone (as well as in the island of Kyūshū in Japan). Counts are done multiple times throughout the winter to study their movement patterns.

The white-naped crane uses shallow wetlands and wet meadows for breeding sites. Generally, they can be found along lake edges and river valleys. They can also be found in mixed forest grasslands or lowlands. When foraging, they will use these sites but will also turn to farmlands for grazing.

== Behaviour and ecology ==
=== Breeding ===
The white-naped crane breeds in the spring. They nest in pairs, and the nests tend to be located in areas of deeper water depth, which can provide protection against predators. Eggs are laid for two months, between April and the end of May. When chicks are born, they are a brownish-yellow colour with dark spots, and remain fledglings for 70–75 days. They will become sexually mature between the ages of 2 and 3 years old. When exhibiting parental behaviour, the crane will use a contact call, which is a lower frequency call used when the chicks are in close proximity to the parent.

=== Diet ===
During the breeding season, their diet mainly consists of wetland plants, tubers and roots. While wintering or during migration, they will also feed on rice and cereal grains, as well as more waste grain. They will stand in place and dig for the deeper vegetation, which contrasts with the feeding behaviour of the red-crowned crane, which will walk around and pick at the surface vegetation. This difference is important as it allows both species of crane to occupy similar niches, without competition between them.

=== Threats ===
The biggest threats faced by this species of crane is the ongoing loss of habitat, degradation of wetlands and climate change. Wetlands are consistently being converted to farmlands in China and eastern Russia. This also increases the disturbances from both people and livestock. More interactions with human populations are due to the fragmentation of the wetlands habitats, and this can result in both illegal hunting by humans as well as predation by free-roaming dogs. While the white-naped crane is not a game species, it is frequently disturbed by the hunting of other aquatic game species in the spring during its breeding season.

Changes in climate have been affecting the hydrology and quality of their breeding sites: droughts have become more prevalent in wetlands, which impacts their nesting sites. Drier conditions have led to fires which have destroyed nesting sites and breeding sites, as well as eggs and young. The concentration of individuals in their breeding or overwintering sites has increased due to the loss of habitat, and this facilitates the spread of disease and death in their populations.

== Relationship with humans ==
In recent years, there has been an increase in crane and human conflict due to the expansion of agricultural practices. Larger areas of land within the distribution of the white-naped crane used to be available for grazing and foraging, but agricultural lands have been developed and this contributes to the fragmentation of wetland habitats. Agricultural fields provide an ideal food source for white-naped cranes; therefore, they will feed off of the crops and damage them. This creates problems with farmers and sometimes the hunting and killing of a crane. Methods to reduce such conflicts include visual and acoustic disturbance, physical barriers and changes in farming practice.

In captivity, there is a risk that hatchlings imprint on humans, which can cause them to reject same-species mates, and prefer to bond with humans. A notable example of this was Walnut, whose two-decade bond with her keeper Chris Crowe was widely reported.

== Status and conservation ==
The white-naped crane is listed as vulnerable on the IUCN Red List, as well as on CITES Appendices I and II. An estimated 3,700 to 4,500 mature individuals remain in the wild, as of 2018. There is some form of legal protection and the creation of protected areas put in place by all countries within its distribution range. Long term monitoring has been carried out in Russia, as well as northeast Mongolia. Notably, some of the important habitats of the white-naped crane are owned by the waterbird flyway site network under the East Asian – Australasian Flyway Partnership. These sites have been proposed to be nominated as protected wetland sites by RAMSAR. According to the IUCN Red List, they have proposed to establish certain transboundary protected areas between Russia, China and North Korea as well. Artificial feeding stations have also been put in place in Japan, which has been shown to increase their wintering population. Banding and use of radio telemetry has been used to study the migration routes and wintering areas of this species in order to better understand how they can be protected.

== Gallery ==
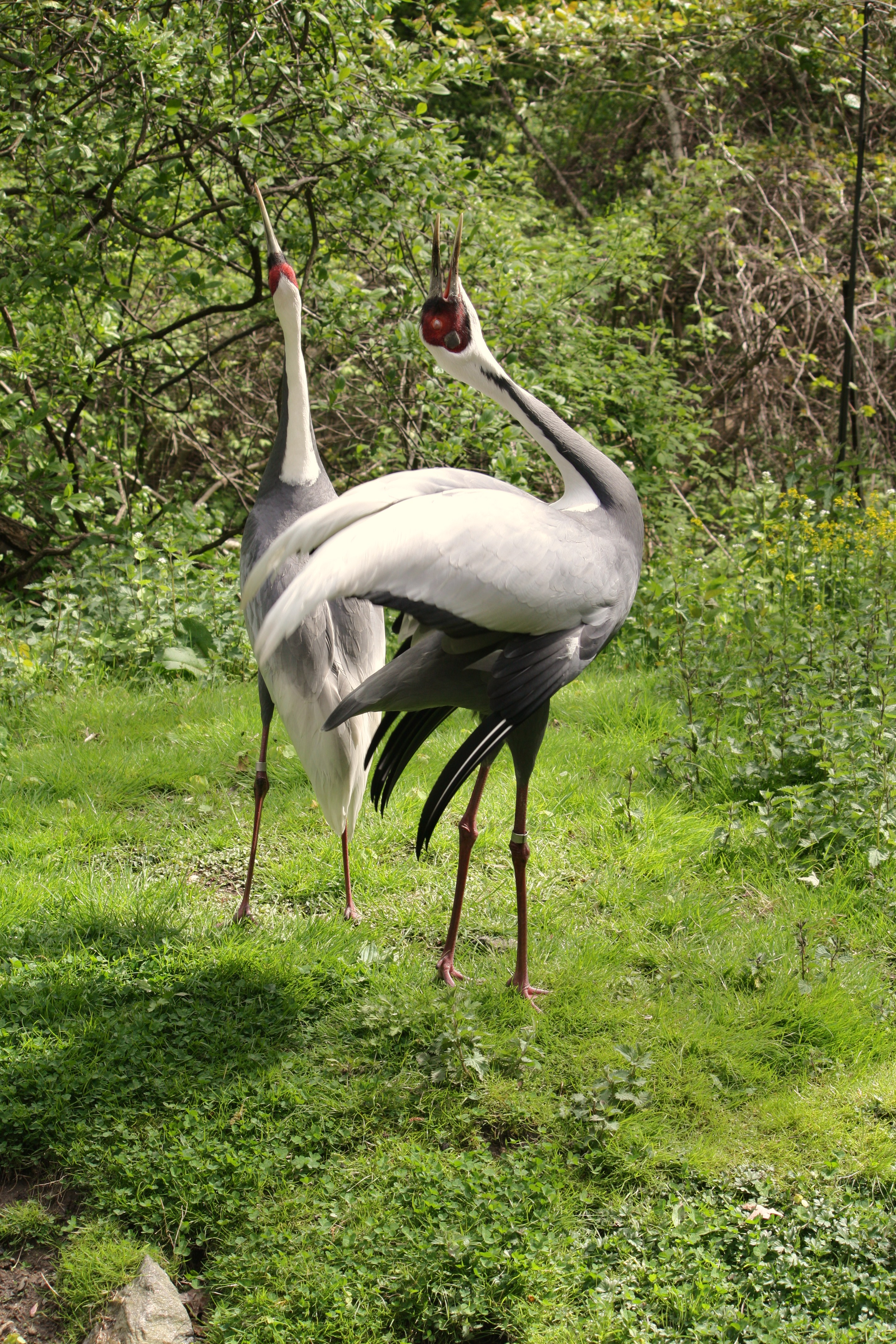
A mated pair performing a "unison call", which strengthens the pair bond and provides a territorial warning to other cranes.

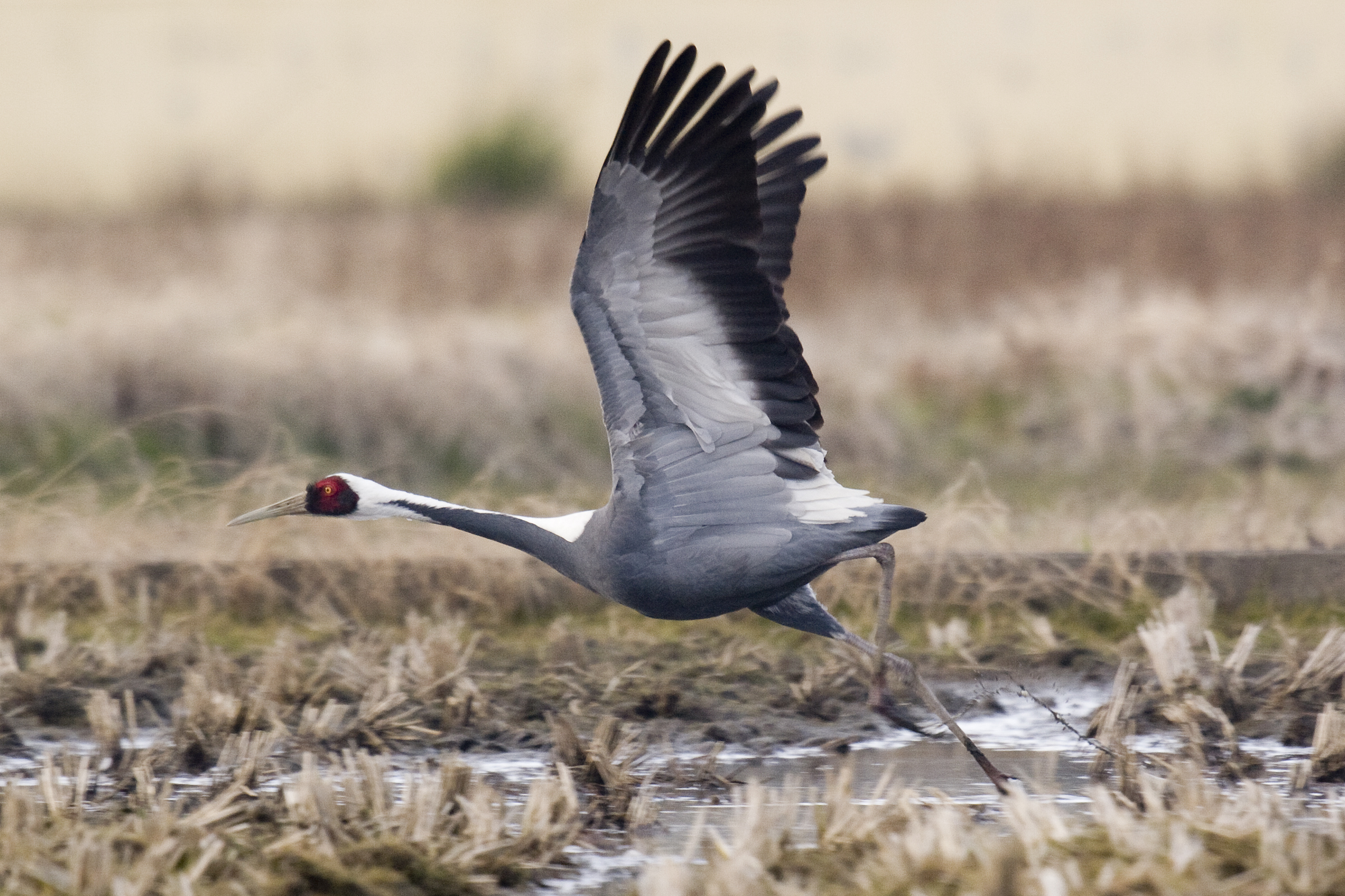
Adult running with wings outspread, Saijō, Ehime Prefecture, Japan

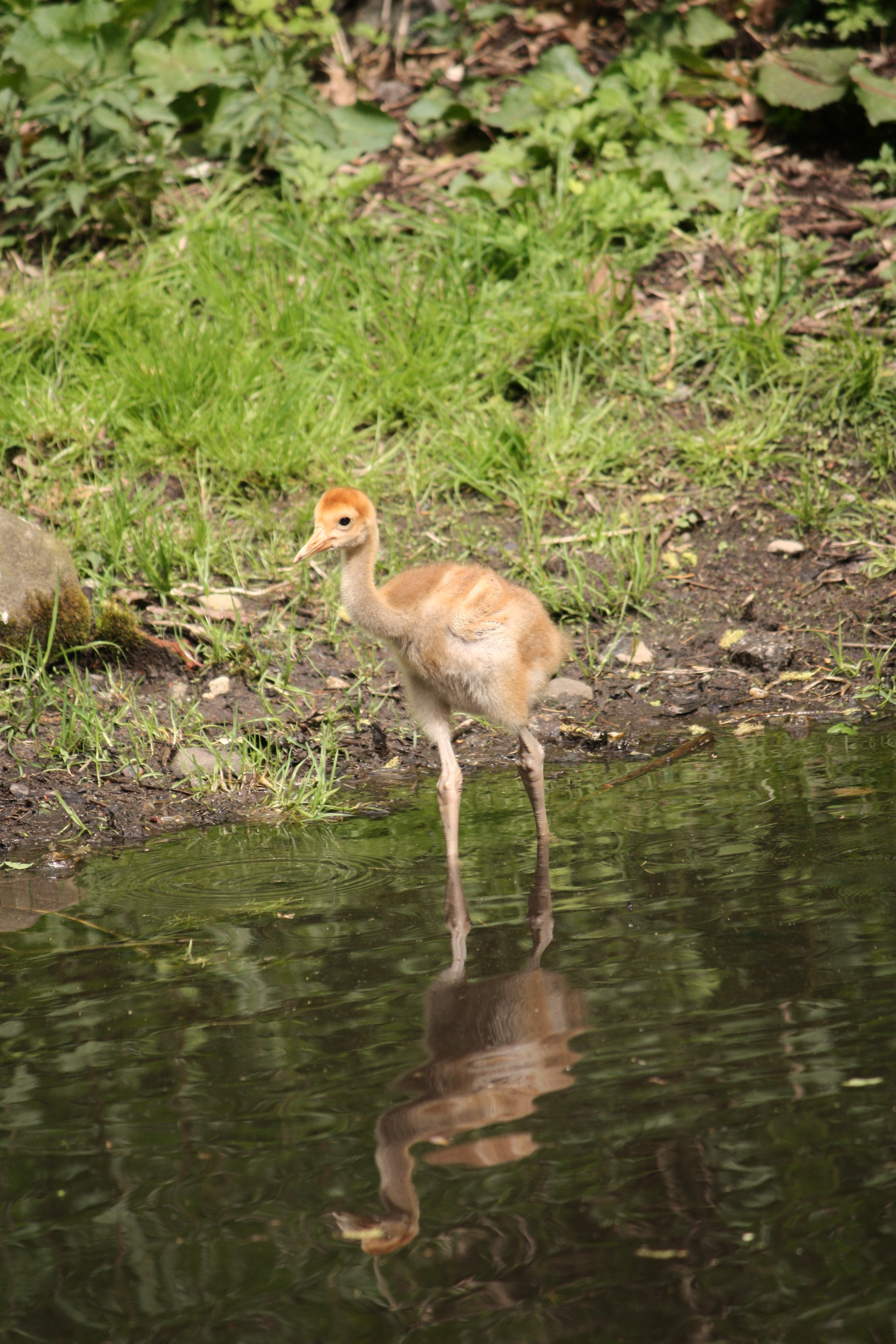
Juvenile

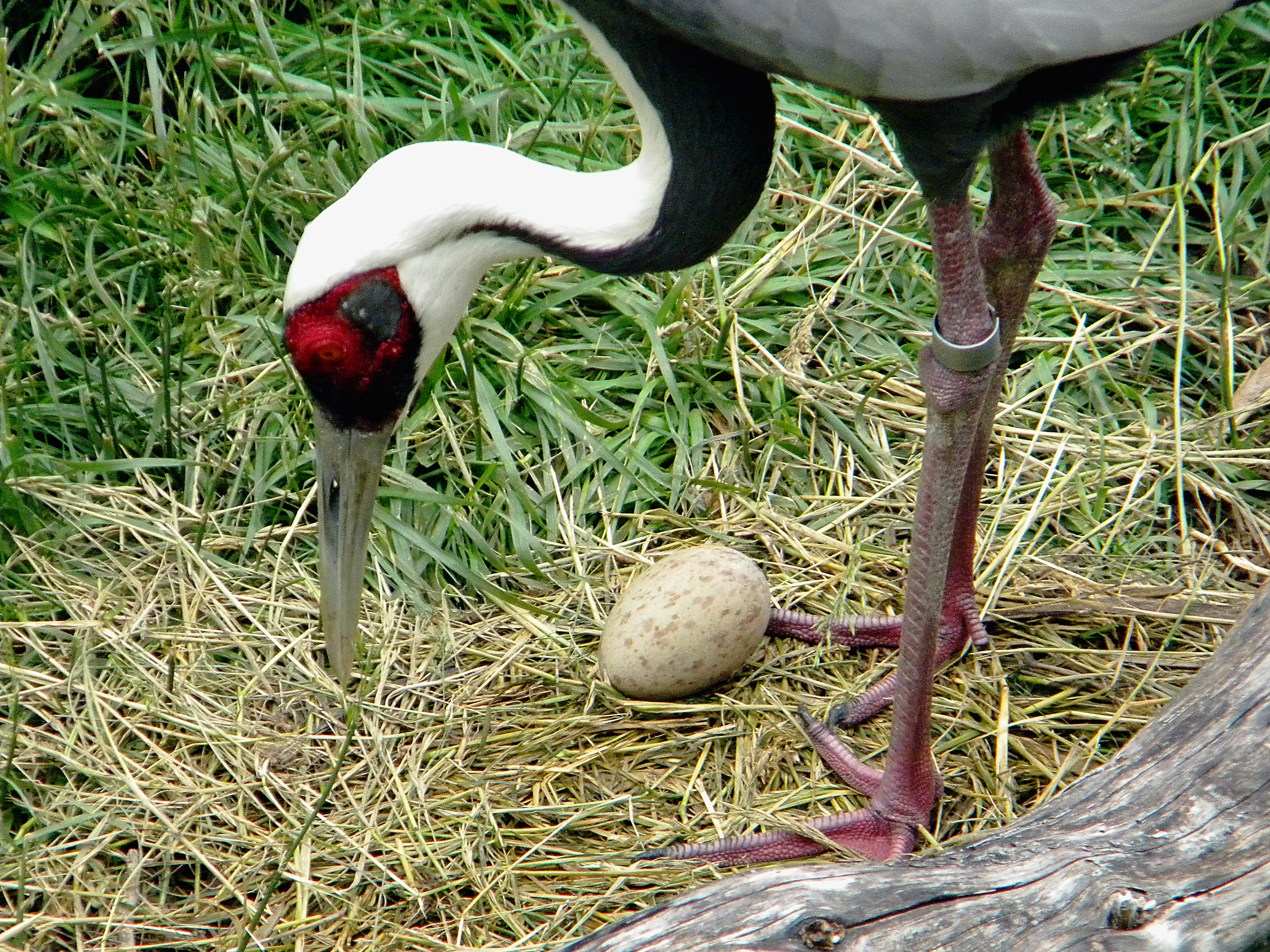
Adult and egg

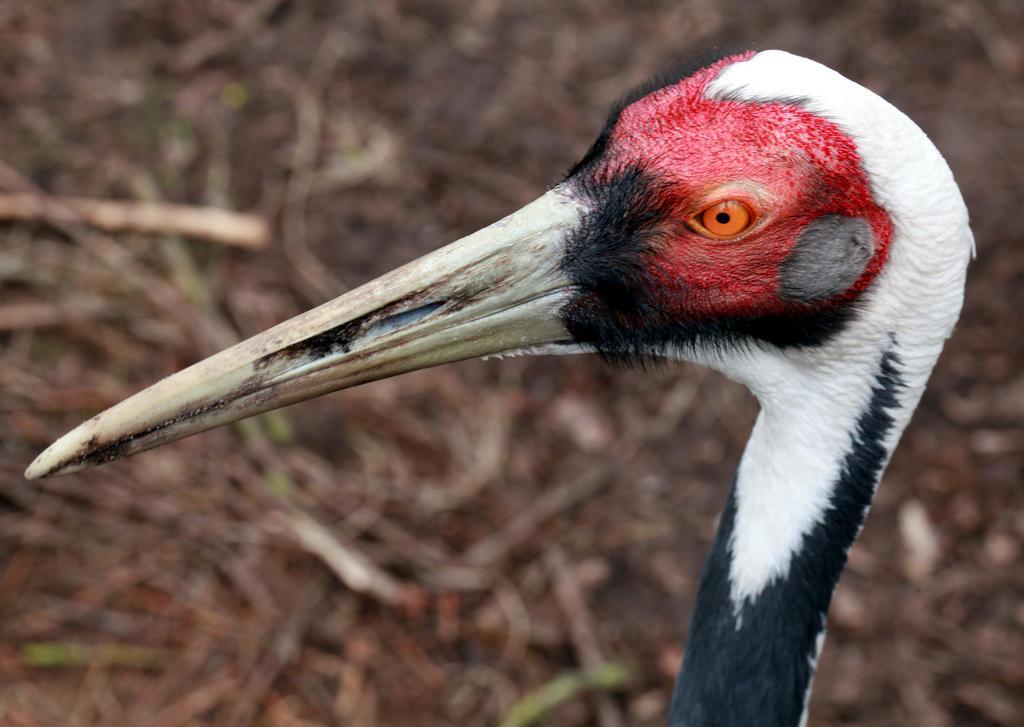
Head

A pair of White-naped cranes in captivity at Beijing Wildlife Park, China.
