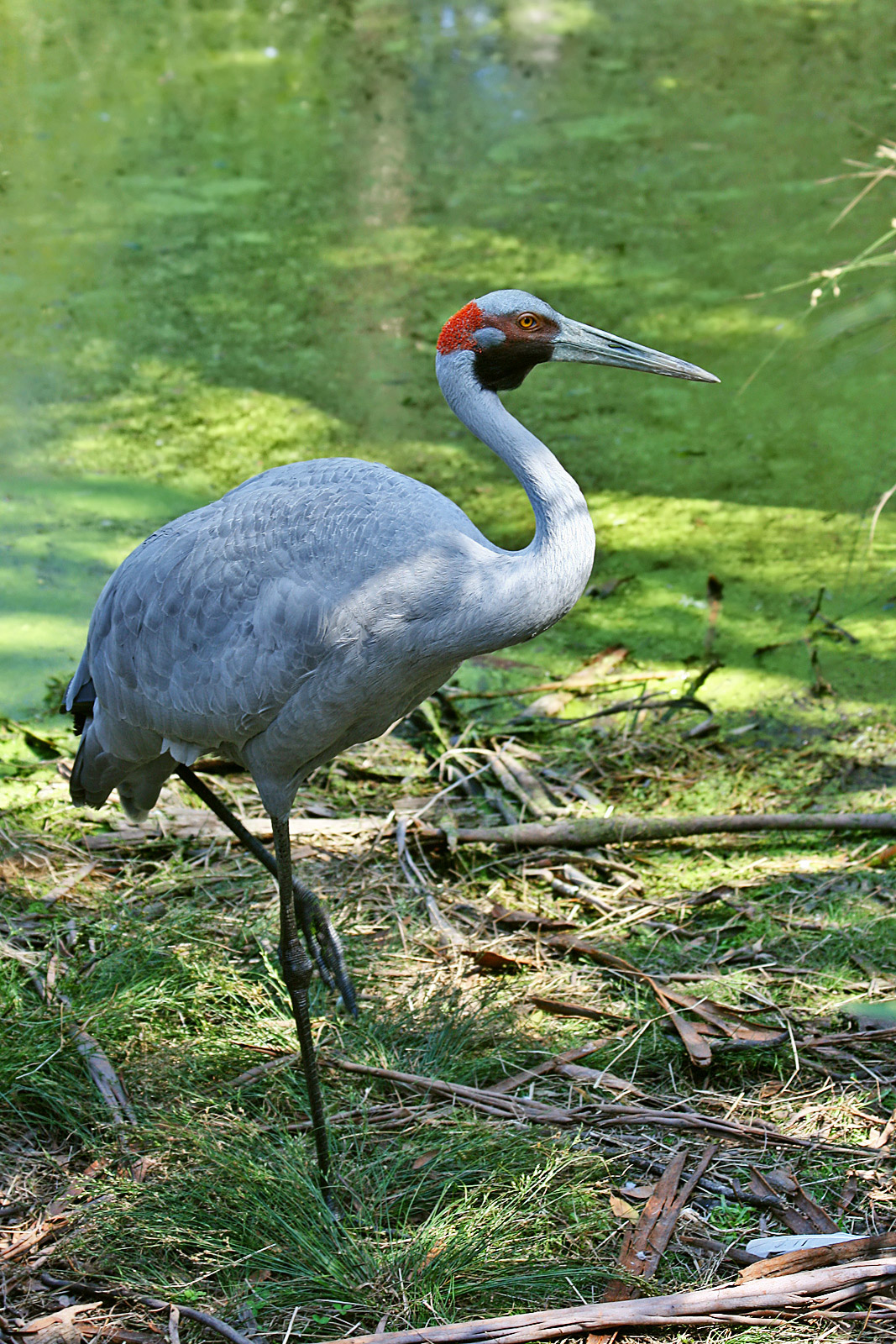
- Brolga (Antigone rubicunda), Healesville Sanctuary, Victoria

Conservation status
- Least Concern (IUCN 3.1)
- CITES Appendix II

Scientific classification
- Kingdom: Animalia
- Phylum: Chordata
- Class: Aves
- Order: Gruiformes
- Family: Gruidae
- Genus: Antigone
- Species: A. rubicunda

Binomial name
- Antigone rubicunda (Perry, 1810)
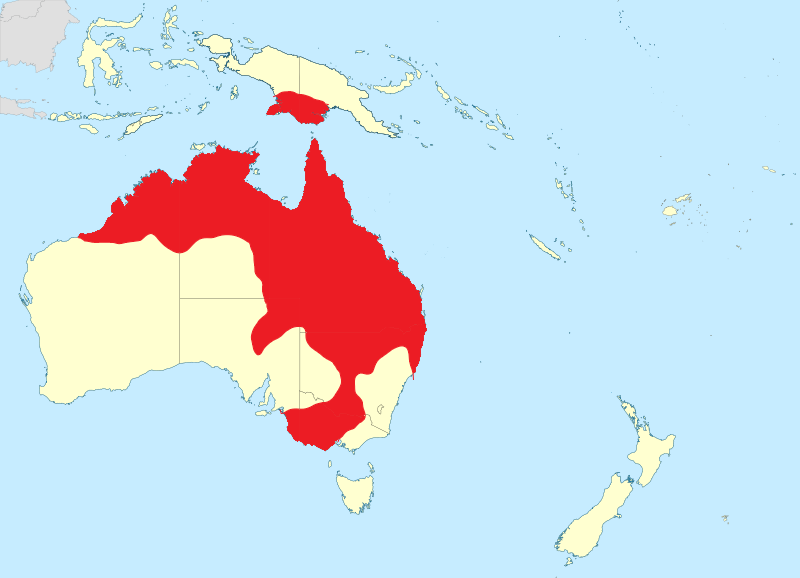
- Distribution in red

Synonyms
- Ardea rubicunda; Grus antarctica Illiger, 1816; Mathewsia rubicunda (Iredale, 1911); Grus rubicundus; Grus australasianus

= Brolga =

Species of bird

The brolga (Antigone rubicunda), formerly known as the native companion, is a bird in the crane family. It has also been given the name Australian crane, a term coined in 1865 by well-known ornithologist John Gould in his Birds of Australia.

The brolga is a common, gregarious wetland bird species of tropical and south-eastern Australia and New Guinea. It is a tall, upright bird with a small head, long beak, slender neck, and long legs. Its plumage is mainly grey, with black wing tips, and it has an orange-red band on its head. The brolga's courting dance is similar to that of other cranes. The nest is built of wetland vegetation, either on an elevated piece of land or floating on shallow water in marshland, and usually two eggs are laid. Incubation takes 32 days, and the newly hatched young are precocial. The adult diet is omnivorous and includes plant matter, invertebrates, and small vertebrates.

Although the bird is not considered endangered over the majority of its range, populations are showing some decline, especially in southern Australia, and local action plans are being undertaken in some areas. It has featured on the Queensland coat of arms since 1977 and was formally declared as the bird emblem of the state in 1986.

== Taxonomy ==
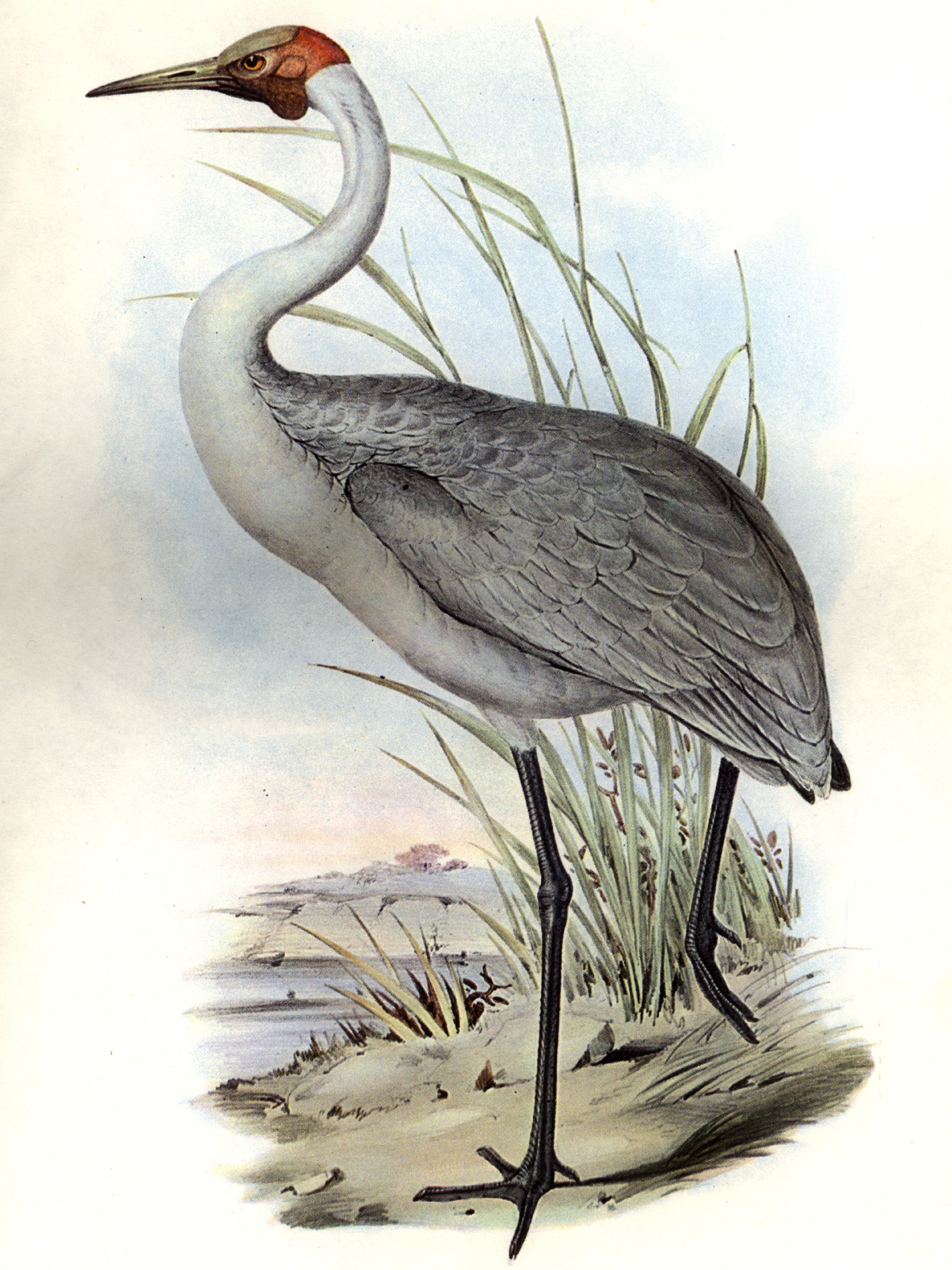
An 1865 brolga illustration from Birds of Australia by John Gould

When first described by the naturalist George Perry in 1810, the brolga was misclassified as a species of Ardea, the genus that includes the herons and egrets. It is, in fact, a member of the Gruiformes—the order that includes the crakes, rails, and cranes, and a member of the genus Antigone. Ornithologist John Gould used the name Grus australasianus when he wrote about it and noted it to be widespread in the north and east of Australia. He also recorded that it was easy to tame, and that James Macarthur had kept a pair at his home in Camden. Calling it the Australian crane, he mentioned that its early colonial name had been native companion. The Royal Australasian Ornithologists Union made brolga, a popular name derived from Gamilaraay burralga, the official name for the bird in 1926.

In 1976, it was suggested that the brolga, sarus crane (Antigone antigone), and white-naped crane (Antigone vipio) formed a natural group on the basis of similarities in their calls. This was further confirmed by molecular studies of their DNA. These also showed that the brolga is more closely related to the white-naped crane than it is to the morphologically more similar sarus crane.

The brolga was formerly placed in the genus Grus, but a molecular phylogenetic study published in 2010 found that the genus, as then defined, was polyphyletic. In the resulting rearrangement to create monophyletic genera, four species, including the brolga, were placed in the resurrected genus Antigone that had originally been erected by German naturalist Ludwig Reichenbach in 1853

Two subspecies were suspected to exist: A. r. argentea found in Western Australia, the Northern Territory and western Queensland and A. r. rubicunda, occurring in New Guinea, Queensland, New South Wales, Victoria, and South Australia. However, mitochondrial analyses have shown both populations sharing haplotypes indicating that they are a single taxon, though microsatellite markers show limited gene flow between the two populations.

== Description ==
The brolga is a tall bird with a large beak, a long and slender neck, and stilt-like legs. The sexes are indistinguishable in appearance, though females are usually a little smaller. The adult has a grey-green, skin-covered crown, and the face, cheeks, and throat pouch are also featherless and are coral red. Other parts of the head are olive green and clothed in dark bristles. The gular pouch, which is particularly pendulous in adult males, is covered with such dense bristles as to make it appear black. The beak is greyish-green in adult birds, long and slender, and the irises are yellowish-orange. The ear coverts appear as a grey patch of small feathers surrounded by red naked skin and the body plumage is silvery-grey. The feathers on the back and the wing coverts have pale margins. The primary wing feathers are black and the secondaries grey. The legs and feet are greyish-black. Juveniles lack the red band and have fully feathered heads with dark irises. A fully grown brolga can reach a height of 0.7 to 1.4 m (2 ft 4 in to 4 ft 7 in) and has a wingspan of 1.7 to 2.4 m (5 ft 7 in to 7 ft 10 in). Adult males have an average body mass of 6.8 kg (15 lb) with females averaging 5.66 kg (12.5 lb). The weight can range from 3.6 to 8.7 kg (7.9 to 19.2 lb). Heights up to 1.8 m (5 ft 11 in) in male brolga have been reported but presumably need confirmation. The brolga is the heaviest flying bird regularly found in mainland Australia, averaging slightly higher in body mass than other large resident species such as black swan, Australian pelican and the Australian race of sarus crane (Asian sarus cranes are heavier and significantly taller). Brolgas are as well as much heavier on average than the biggest flying land birds such as the very sexually-dimorphic Australian bustard and wedge-tailed eagle), although heavier birds such as wandering albatross may be seen as marine vagrants off the mainland. Brolgas probably rival black-necked storks and sarus cranes as the tallest flying birds in Australia.

The brolga can easily be confused with the sarus crane, but the latter's red head-colouring extends partly down the neck, while the brolga's is confined to the head. The brolga is more silvery-grey in colour than the sarus, the legs are blackish rather than pink, and the trumpeting and grating calls it makes are at a lower pitch. Additionally, in Australia, sarus crane distribution is limited to north-eastern areas, compared to the more widespread distribution of the brolga.

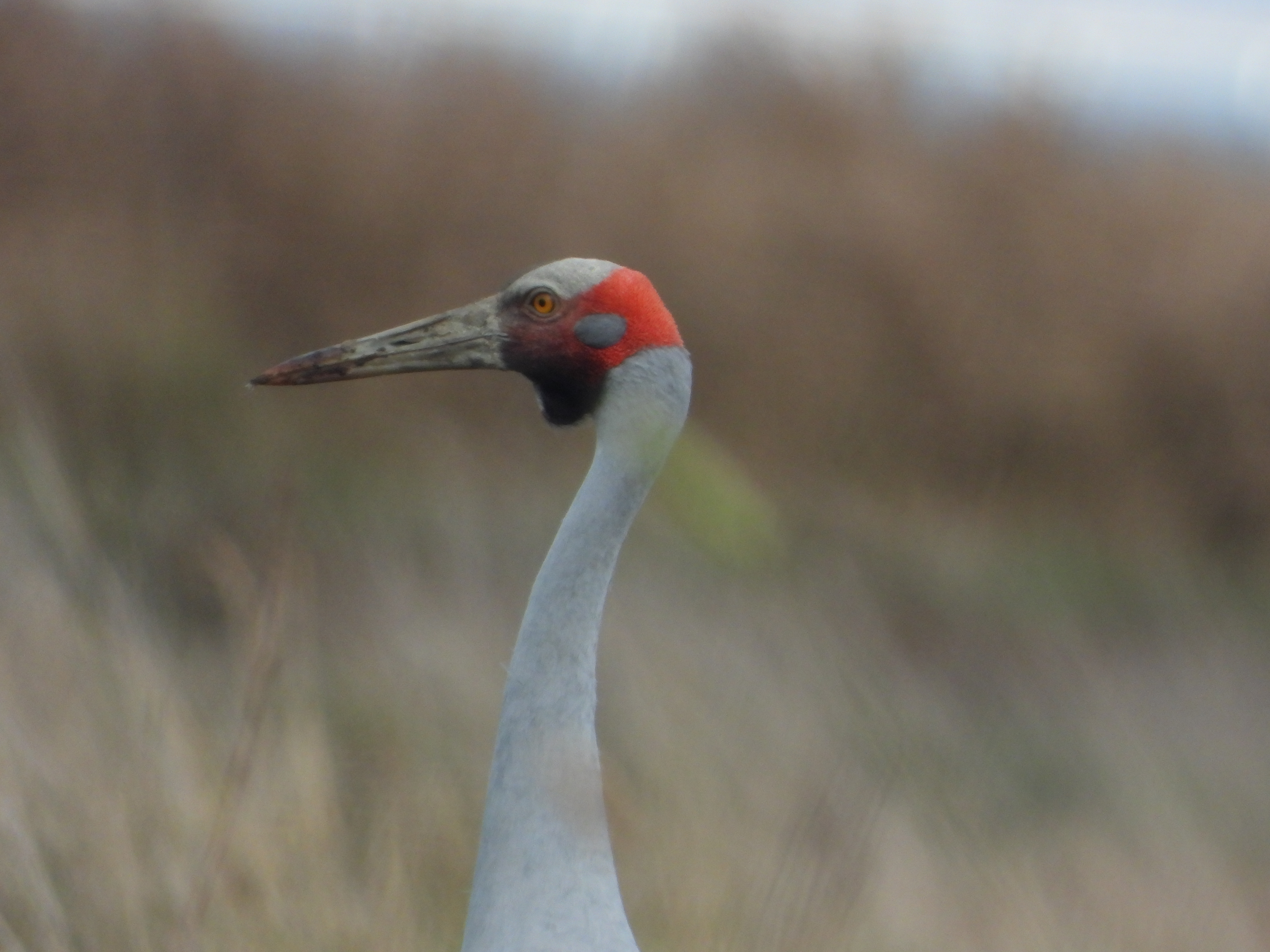

== Distribution and habitat ==
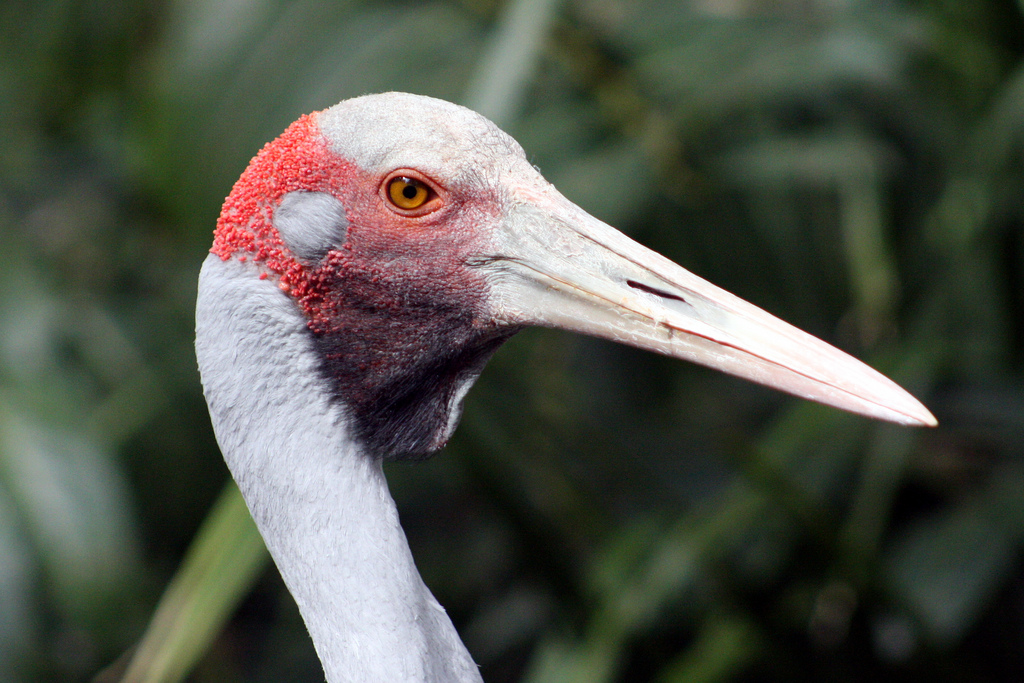
Close up of the head

Brolgas are widespread and often abundant in north and north-east Australia, especially north-east Queensland, and are common as far south as Victoria. They are also found in southern New Guinea and as rare vagrants in New Zealand and the northern part of Western Australia. The population in northern Australia is estimated at between 20,000 and 100,000 birds and in southern Australia, 1,000 birds. The number of individuals in New Guinea is unknown. Until 1961, brolgas were thought to be the only species of crane in Australia, until the sarus crane was also located in Queensland.

Brolga movements in Australia are poorly understood, though seasonal flocks are observed in eastern Queensland in nonbreeding areas regularly, and a few coastal populations are suspected to move up to 500 km (310 mi) inland. Little is known of the movements and habitats of the New Guinea populations.

Further south, in Victoria and New South Wales, rainfall is spread more evenly throughout the year and the driest season lasts from December to May. At this time, southern populations congregate in inland flocking areas, which include upland marshes, the edges of reservoirs and lakes, pastures, and agricultural land. When rain arrives in June and July, they disperse to the coastal freshwater marshes, shallow lakes, wet meadows, and other wetlands where they breed. In south-west Victoria, breeding sites during and immediately after spring are freshwater wetlands, while freshwater, brackish and saline wetland sites are used for flocking during the autumn.

Queensland has the greatest numbers of brolgas, and sometimes flocks of over 1,000 individuals are seen. The bird is the official bird emblem for the state and also appears on its coat of arms. Breeding pairs and flocks are distributed across several floodplains along the Gulf of Carpentaria. Brolgas here preferentially use two grassland-dominated regional ecosystems (2.3.1 and 2.3.4), though over 30% of the cranes share four additional Eucalyptus-dominated woodland regional ecosystems with sarus cranes. Brolga numbers were highest in floodplains where grassland habitats dominated, and the largest flocks were also found in grassland habitats.

== Ecology and behaviour ==
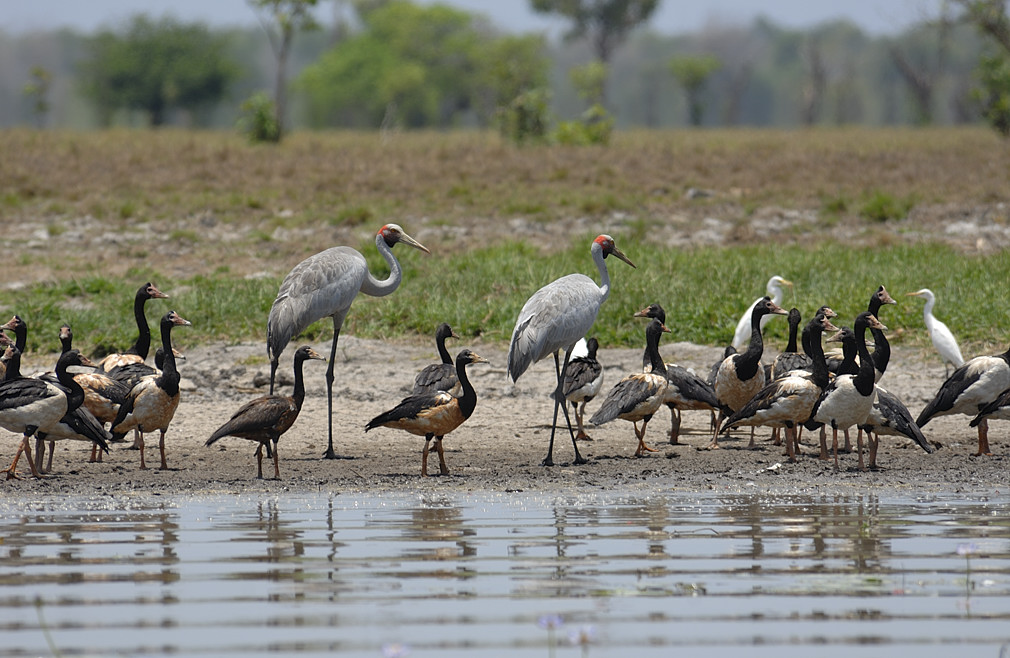
A pair of brolgas amongst other waterbirds in the Northern Territory

The social unit of brolgas is very similar to that observed in sarus cranes. In breeding areas, breeding pairs defend territories against other brolgas, and when breeding efforts are successful, they remain in territories with one or two chicks. Nonbreeding birds, being young birds of past years as well as adults that do not yet have breeding territories, are also found in breeding areas, likely throughout the year. In the nonbreeding season, they gather into large flocks, which appear to be many self-contained individual groups rather than a single social unit. Within the flock, families sometimes remain separate and coordinate their activities with one another rather than with the flock as a whole. In south-western Queensland, 26–40% of all crane sightings were breeding pairs and families in the Gilbert and Flinders river floodplains. Flocks were relatively rarer, but birds in flocks in the Flinders river floodplain constituted 80% of all brolgas counted. In south-west Victoria, distinct breeding (spring) and flocking (autumn) seasons are noted.

When taking off from the ground, their flight is ungainly, with much flapping of wings. The bird's black wingtips are visible while it is in the air, and once it gathers speed, its flight is much more graceful and it often ascends to great heights. Here, it may be barely discernible as it wheels in great circles, sometimes emitting its hoarse cry.

=== Diet ===
Brolgas are omnivorous and forage in wetlands, saltwater marshes, and farmlands. They tear up the ground with their powerful beaks in search of bulbs and edible roots. Northern populations have a very varied diet, with minimal contribution of vegetation. They also eat the shoots and leaves of wetland and upland plants, cereal grains, seeds, insects, mollusks, crustaceans, frogs, and lizards. In saltwater marshes, they may drink saline water, as they have glands near their eyes through which they can excrete excess salt. Isotopic analyses of molted feathers in their breeding grounds along the Gulf of Carpentaria showed their diet to be diverse across multiple trophic levels, with minimal contribution of vegetation. Analyses showed strong niche separation between brolgas and sarus cranes by diet. Their diet in dry season flocks at Atherton Highlands likely are very different owing to the largely agricultural landscape.

=== Mating and breeding ===
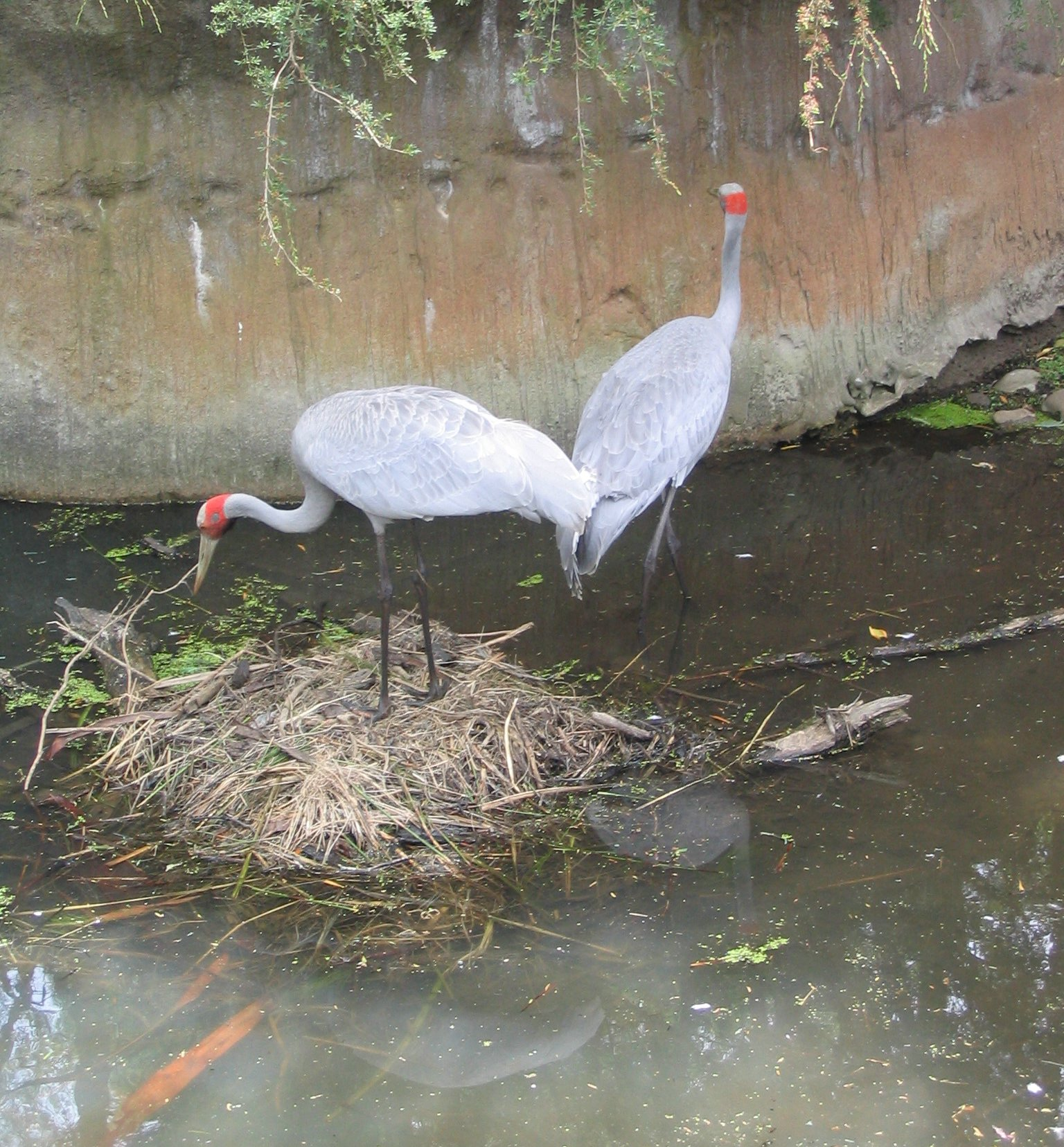
Pair at nest at Healesville Sanctuary near Melbourne

Brolgas are monogamous and usually bond for life, though new pairings may follow the death of one individual. A feature of a bonded couple is the synchronous calling, which the female usually initiates. She stands with her wings folded and beak pointed to the sky and emits a series of trumpeting calls. The male stands alongside in a similar posture, but with his wings flared and primaries drooping, which is the only time when sex can be differentiated reliably. The male emits one longer call for every two emitted by the female.

Brolgas are well known for their ritualised, intricate mating dances. The performance begins with a bird picking up some grass and tossing it into the air before catching it in its bill. The bird then jumps a metre (yard) into the air with outstretched wings and continues by stretching its neck, bowing, strutting around, calling, and bobbing its head up and down. Sometimes, just one brolga dances for its mate; often they dance in pairs; and sometimes a whole group of about a dozen dance together, lining up roughly opposite each other before they start.

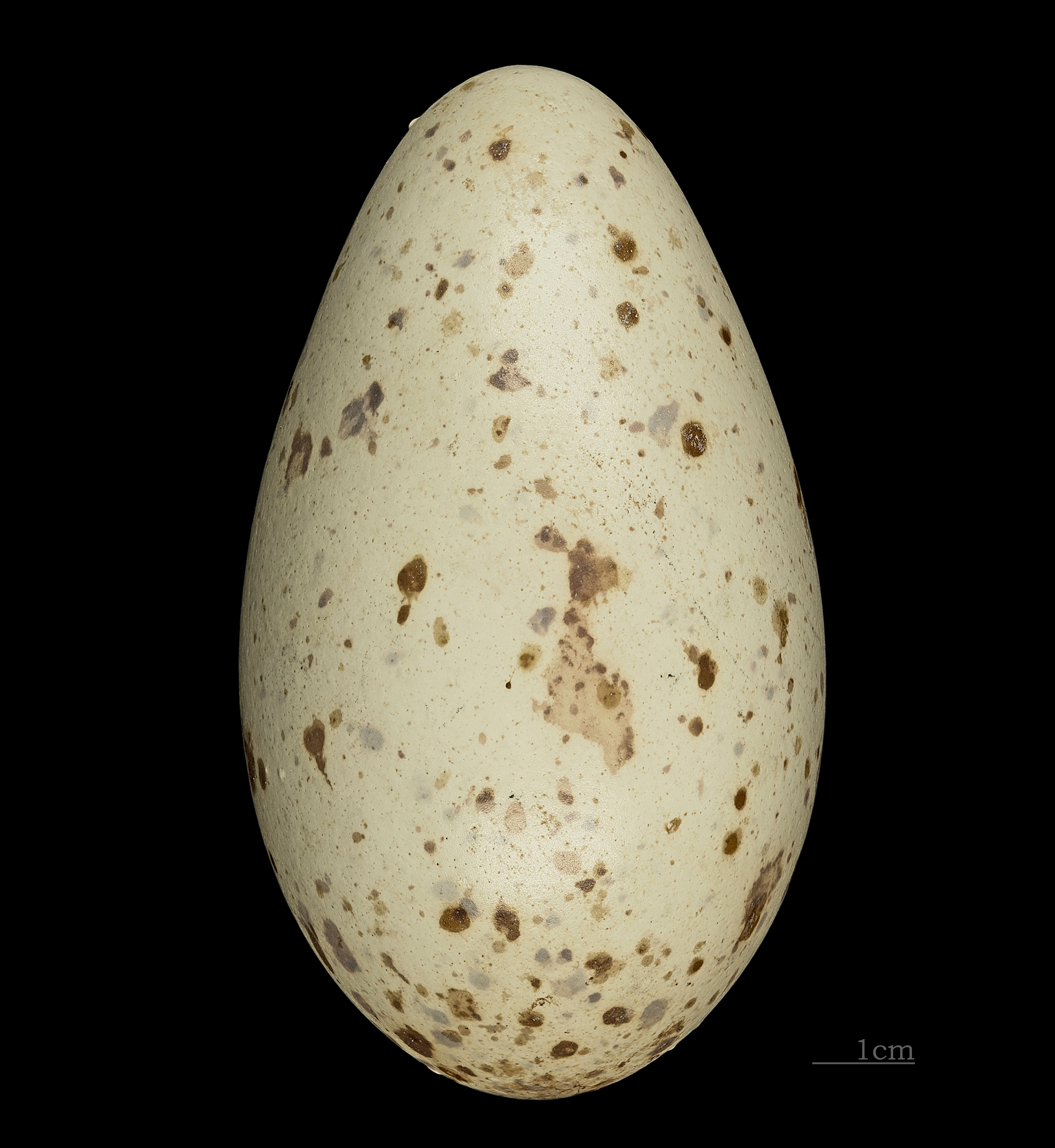
Egg of A. rubicunda

The brolga breeds throughout its range in Australia and New Guinea. The start of the breeding season is largely determined by rainfall rather than the time of year; thus, the season is February to May after the rainy season in the monsoonal areas, and September to December in southern Australia. It is unclear whether all breeding pairs leave breeding territories to join flocks during the dry season or return the subsequent breeding season, and this behavior may vary with location. In food-rich habitats, nests can be quite close together, and in Queensland, are found in the same area as those of the sarus crane. The nest, which is built by both sexes, is a raised mound of uprooted grass, and other plant material sited on a small island in shallow water, or occasionally floating. Sometimes, the birds make hardly any nest, take over a disused swan nest, or simply lay on bare ground. Nests were initiated between November and February in the Gilbert and Flinders River basins, and tracked rainfall episodes in each river basin.

A single brood is produced per year. The clutch size is usually two, but occasionally one or three eggs are laid about two days apart. The dull white eggs are sparsely spotted or blotched with reddish brown, with the markings being denser at the larger end of the egg. They measure 95 by 61 mm (3.7 by 2.4 in), though larger eggs were found in a clutch of three eggs. Both sexes incubate the eggs, with the female sitting on the nest at night. Hatching is not synchronised, and occurs after about 32 days of incubation. The newly hatched chicks are covered with grey down and weigh about 100 g (3.5 oz). They are precocial and are able to leave the nest within a day or two. Both parents feed and guard the young. The chicks fledge within 4–5 weeks, are fully feathered within 3 months, and are able to fly about 2 weeks later. When threatened, they hide and stay quiet, while the parents perform a broken-wing display to distract the predator. The adults continue to protect the young for up to 11 months, or for nearly 2 years if they do not breed again in the interim. Breeding pairs maintain discrete territories within which they raise chicks. Territory sizes in Victoria, south-eastern Australia, ranged between 70 and 523 hectares, and each crane territory had a mix of farmland and wetlands. Families roosted in wetlands at night, and moved an average distance of 442 m to and from these night roosts. Each family used multiple wetlands within their territories, either switching between them, or using wetlands sequentially. Breeding success of territorial pairs (estimated as percentage of pairs that successfully fledged at least one chick) was 59% in the Gilbert River basin and 46% in the Flinders River basin (using a total of 80 pairs located on territories), with 33% of all successful pairs fledging two chicks each.

== Conservation status ==
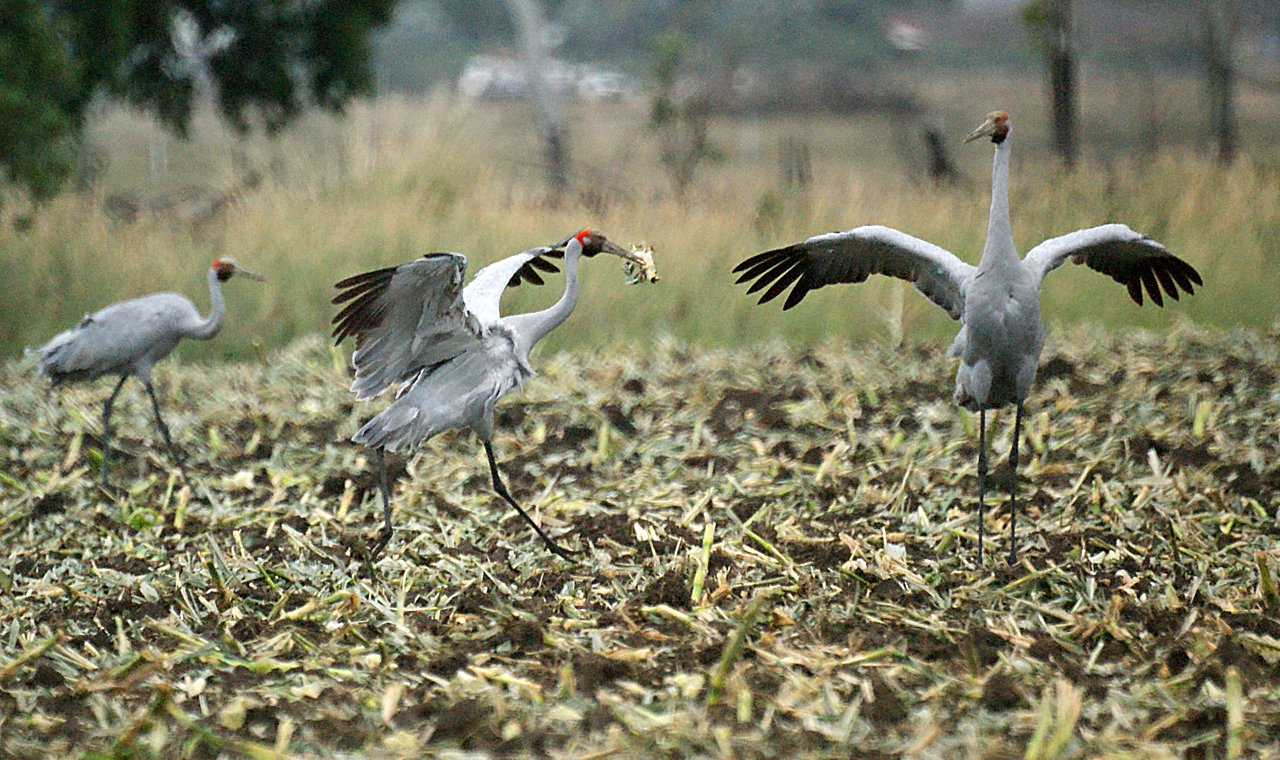
Brolgas on a corn field

The IUCN Red List of Threatened Species lists the brolga as being of "least concern" because it has a large range and a population of more than 10,000 individuals. As of 2024, the population was estimated to be stable. Brolgas are not listed as threatened on the Australian Environment Protection and Biodiversity Conservation Act 1999. However, their conservation status varies from state to state within Australia. For example, the brolga is listed as threatened under the Victorian Flora and Fauna Guarantee Act (1988). Under this Act, an Action Statement for the recovery and future management of this species has been prepared. It is also included in the 2007 advisory list of threatened vertebrate fauna in Victoria where it is listed as vulnerable.

The suspected chief threats faced by the brolga, particularly in the southern part of its range, are habitat destruction particularly spread of blue gum (Eucalyptus globulus) into breeding habitats, the drainage of wetlands, collision with powerlines, burning and grazing regimes, spread of invasive species, and harvesting of eggs. It is more secure in the north-eastern part of its distribution range as the floodplains of Queensland are mostly unsuitable for farming and much of it is in private ownership, but development activities that change or reduce habitat diversity, especially in the Gulf Plains, can have unknown impacts on their populations. Wind farms are an emerging threat, and research on movement and habitat use by breeding pairs and chicks show the importance of locating turbines away from wetlands important for night roosting.

Conservation measures being undertaken include international cooperation, legal protection, research, monitoring, habitat management, education, and the maintenance of captive flocks for propagation and reintroduction. Although the bird breeds well in the wild, breeding it in captivity has proved to be much more problematic.
