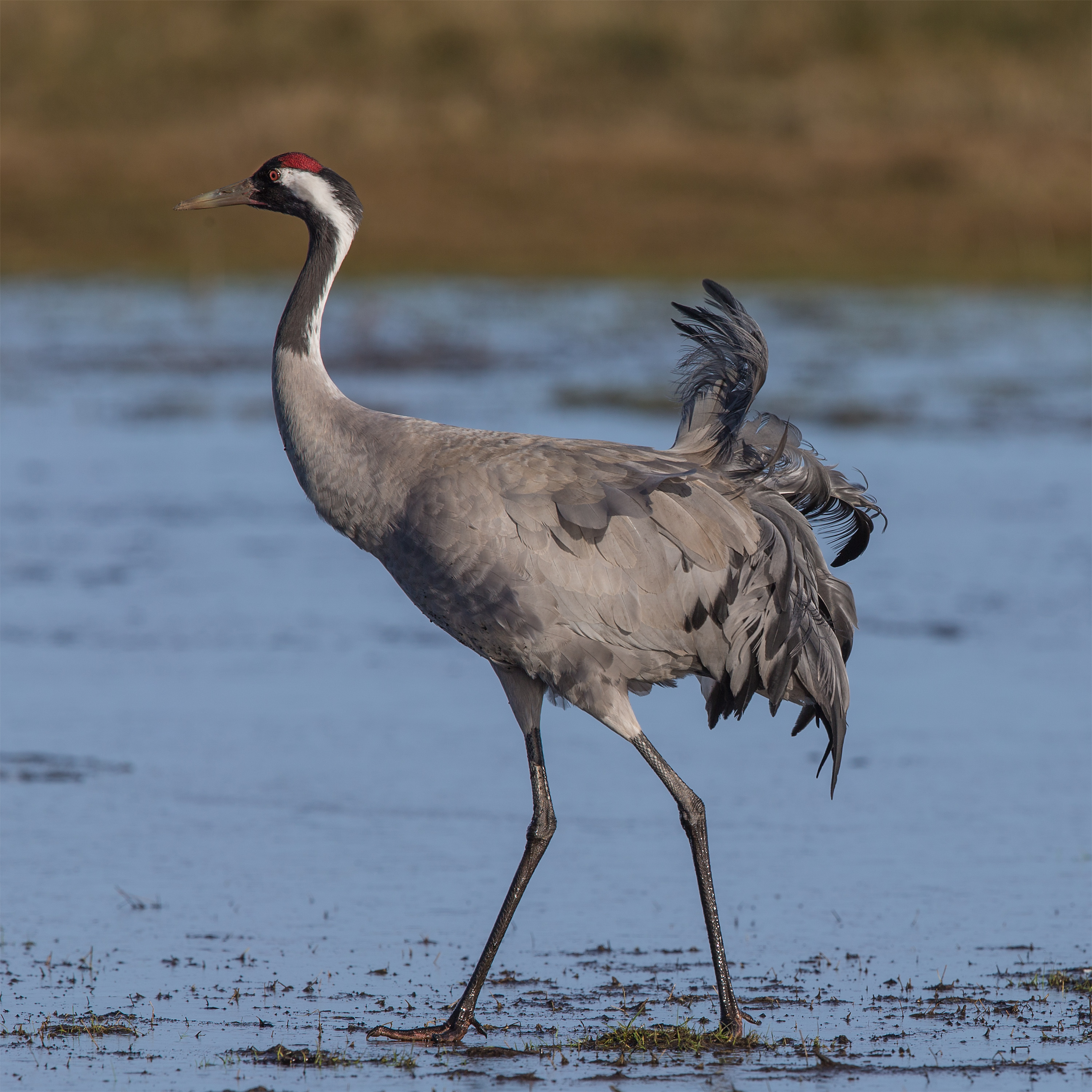
- Common crane (Grus grus)

Scientific classification
- Kingdom: Animalia
- Phylum: Chordata
- Class: Aves
- Order: Gruiformes
- Family: Gruidae
- Genus: Grus; Brisson, 1760

Type species
- Ardea grus

Species
- See text

Synonyms
- Bugeranus; Anthropoides

= Grus (bird) =

Genus of birds

Grus is a genus of large birds in the crane family.

The genus Grus erected by the French zoologist Mathurin Jacques Brisson in 1760. The name Grus is the Latin word for "crane". The German ornithologist Peter Simon Pallas was sometimes credited with erecting the genus in 1766 but the International Commission on Zoological Nomenclature ruled in 1956 that Brisson should have priority.

The genus formerly included additional species. A molecular phylogenetic study published in 2010 found that the genus Grus, as then defined, was polyphyletic. In the resulting rearrangement to create monophyletic genera, the sandhill crane, the white-naped crane, the sarus crane and the brolga were moved to the resurrected genus Antigone that had been erected by the German naturalist Ludwig Reichenbach in 1853. The Siberian crane was moved to the resurrected monotypic genus Leucogeranus.

== Species ==
The genus contains eight living species:

Image	Scientific name	Common name	Distribution
	Grus carunculata	Wattled crane	Eastern and southern Africa
	Grus paradisea	Blue crane	Southern Africa
	Grus virgo	Demoiselle crane	Central Eurasia, ranging from the Black Sea to Mongolia and northeastern China. There is also a small breeding population in Turkey.
	Grus japonensis	Red-crowned crane	Siberia (eastern Russia), northeastern China, Hokkaidō (northern Japan), the Korean Peninsula, and occasionally in northeastern Mongolia.
	Grus americana	Whooping crane	North America
	Grus grus	Common crane	Europe, Asia and northern Africa
	Grus monacha	Hooded crane	South-central and south-eastern Siberia, Mongolia, China.
	Grus nigricollis	Black-necked crane	The Tibetan Plateau and remote parts of India and Bhutan.

The HBW/BirdLife and Clements checklists place the demoiselle crane and blue crane in the genus Anthropoides, and the wattled crane in the monospecific genus Bugeranus, leaving only the red-crowned, whooping, common, hooded, and black-necked cranes in the genus Grus.

The Cuban flightless crane (Antigone cubensis), which became extinct in the Pleistocene, was formerly assigned to the genus Grus.

== Fossil record ==
The fossil record of the genus stretches back some 12 million years or so. A considerable number of prehistoric species are known, with the oldest, Grus miocaenicus (Middle Miocene of Credinţa, Romania) perhaps not a crane but a junior synonym of the swimming-flamingo Palaelodus ambiguus; ("Grus" problematica certainly is).

- Grus afghana (Late Miocene of Molayan, Afghanistan) - doubtfully distinct from G. penteleci
- Grus sp. 1 (Late Miocene of Love Bone Bed, USA)
- Grus sp. 2 (Late Miocene of Love Bone Bed, USA)
- Grus cf. antigone (Late Miocene/Early Pliocene of Lee Creek Mine, USA)
- Grus nannodes (Late Miocene/Early Pliocene -? Edson Middle Pliocene of Sherman County, USA)
- Grus sp. (Late Miocene/Early Pliocene of Lee Creek Mine, USA)
- Grus haydeni (Late Miocene/Early Pliocene - Pleistocene? of WC USA) - 2 species, one may be same as G. canadensis
- Grus penteleci (Late Miocene - Early Pliocene of C and SE Europe) - formerly in Pliogrus
- Grus sp. (Late Pliocene of Puebla de Valverde, Spain)
- Grus bogatshevi (Late Pleistocene of Azerbaijan) - doubtfully distinct form G. primigenia
- Grus latipes (Shore Hills Late Pleistocene of Bermuda, W Atlantic) - formerly Baeopteryx
- Maltese crane Grus melitensis (Late Pleistocene of Malta) - doubtfully distinct from G. primigenia
- Grus pagei (Late Pleistocene of Rancho La Brea)
- Grus cubensis (Pleistocene and Holocene of Cuba)

Several other fossil gruiforms formerly placed in Grus have since been reclassified into different genera. "Grus" prentici is now in Paragrus, "Grus" princeps, "Grus" excelsa and "Grus" hordwellianus are placed in Palaeogrus, and "Grus" excelsa in Balearica. "Grus" marshi belongs in Aletornis.

More uncertain is the position of Probalearica (variously considered Late Oligocene to Middle Pliocene but probably Late Miocene) from Golboçica (Moldavia) and maybe elsewhere. It is usually regarded a nomen dubium but might belong into Grus. "Grus" conferta (Late Miocene/Early Pliocene of Contra Costa County, USA) is apparently too different from the modern genus to be placed herein, but its affiliations are not well resolved.
