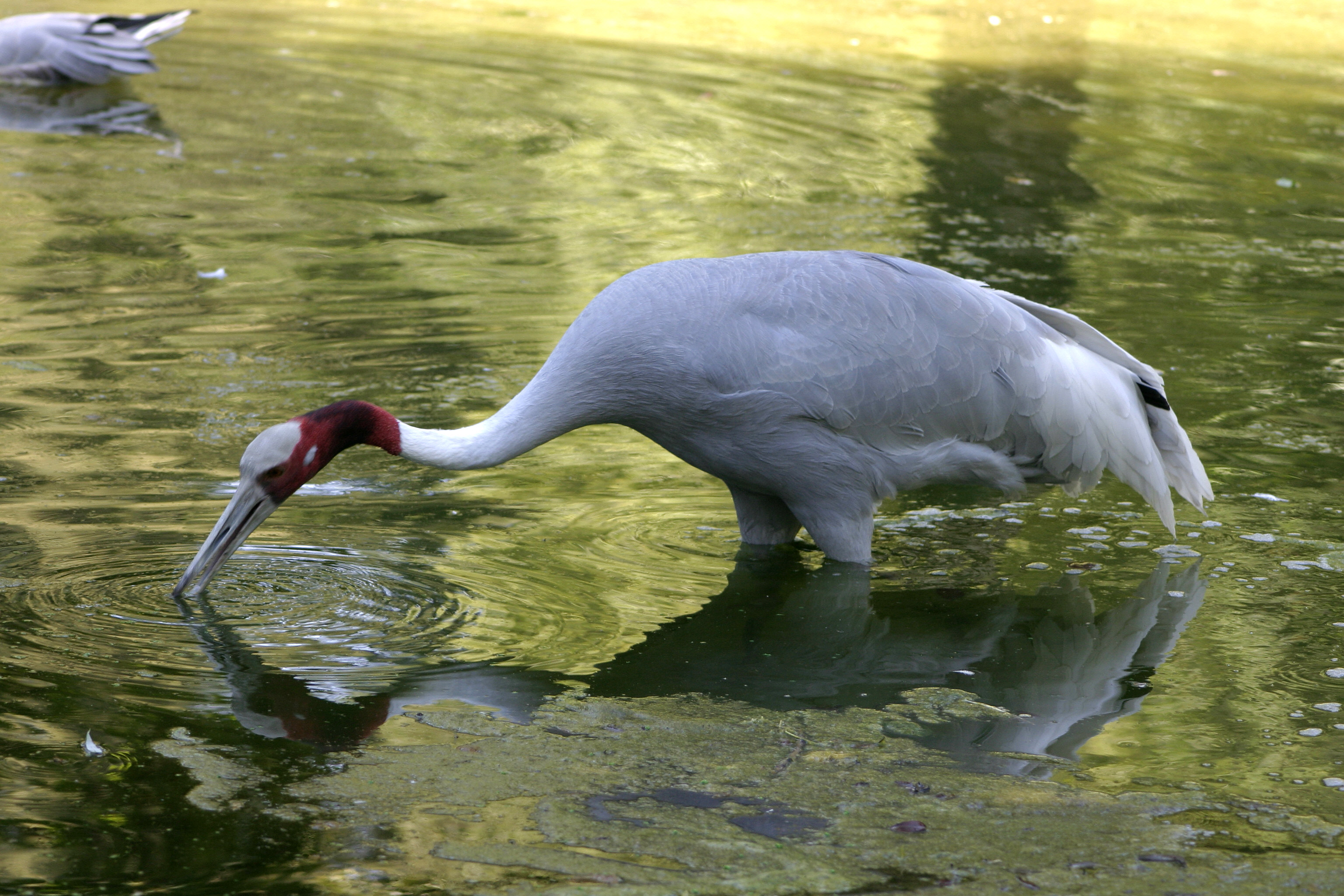
- Sarus crane (Antigone antigone)

Scientific classification
- Kingdom: Animalia
- Phylum: Chordata
- Class: Aves
- Order: Gruiformes
- Family: Gruidae
- Genus: Antigone; Reichenbach, 1853

Type species
- Grus torquata = Ardea antigone Vieillot, 1817

Species
- See text

= Antigone (bird) =

Genus of birds

Antigone is a genus of large birds in the crane family. The species in this genus were formerly placed in the genus Grus.

== Taxonomy ==
Carl Linnaeus gave the binomial name Ardea Antigone to the sarus crane (then known by its Latin name Grus major Indica) apparently due to his confusion between the mythological Greek princess Antigone of Troy, who turned into a stork, and Gerana, the pygmy queen, who turned into a crane.

A molecular phylogenetic study published in 2010 found that the genus Grus was polyphyletic. In the subsequent rearrangement four species were placed in the resurrected genus Antigone. The genus had initially been erected in 1853 by German naturalist Ludwig Reichenbach. The type species is the sarus crane (Antigone antigone).

=== Species ===
The genus includes four species:

Genus Antigone – Reichenbach, 1853 – four species
Common name	Scientific name and subspecies	Range	Size and ecology	IUCN status and estimated population
Sandhill crane	Antigone canadensis (Linnaeus, 1758) Five subspecies: A. c. canadensis (Linnaeus, 1758) – northeast Siberia through Alaska and north Canada to Baffin Island; A. c. tabida (Peters, JL, 1925) – south Canada and west, central United States; A. c. pratensis (Meyer, FAA, 1794) – Georgia and Florida; A. c. pulla (Aldrich, 1972) – Mississippi; A. c. nesiotes (Bangs & Zappey, 1905) – Cuba and Isla de la Juventud (Isle of Pines)	North America and extreme northeastern Siberia	Size: Habitat: Diet:	LC
White-naped crane	Antigone vipio (Pallas, 1811)	Northeastern Mongolia, Northeastern China, and adjacent areas of Southeastern Russia	Size: Habitat: Diet:	VU
Sarus crane	Antigone antigone (Linnaeus, 1758) Four subspecies: A. a. antigone (Linnaeus, 1758) (Indian sarus crane); A. a. sharpii Blanford, 1895 (Indochinese or Burmese sarus crane, Sharpe's crane, red-headed crane); A. a. gilliae Schodde, 1988 (Australian sarus crane); A. a. luzonica Hachisuka, 1941 (Philippine sarus crane – extinct)	Indian subcontinent, Southeast Asia, and Australia	Size: Habitat: Diet:	VU
Brolga	Antigone rubicunda (Perry, 1810)	Northern and eastern Australia and New Guinea	Size: Habitat: Diet:	LC
