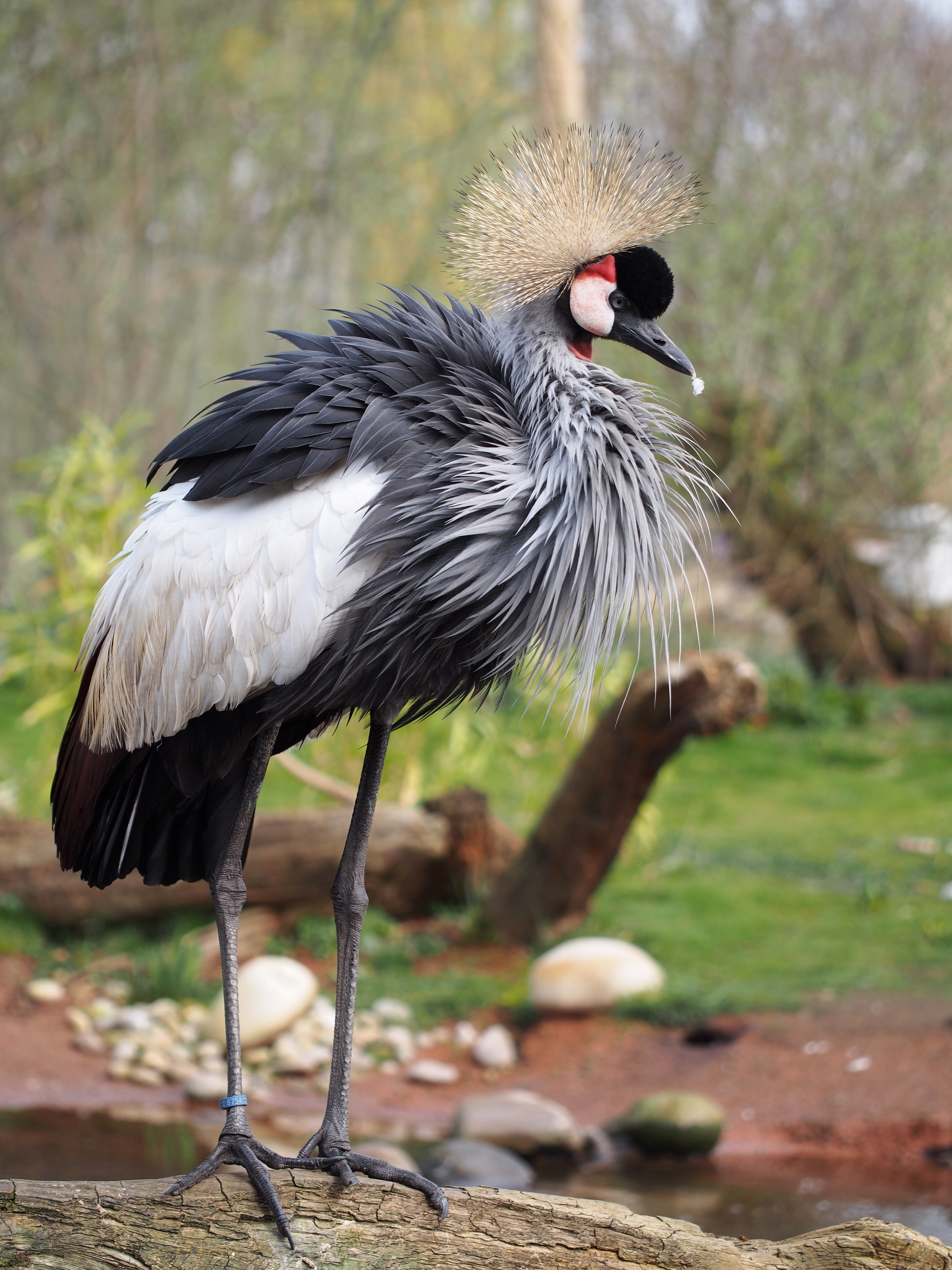
- Grey crowned crane (Balearica regulorum)

Scientific classification
- Kingdom: Animalia
- Phylum: Chordata
- Class: Aves
- Order: Gruiformes
- Family: Gruidae
- Subfamily: Balearicinae
- Genus: Balearica; Brisson, 1760

Type species
- Ardea pavonina Linnaeus, 1758

Species
- See text

Synonyms
- Basityto

= Balearica =

Genus of birds

The bird genus Balearica (also called the crowned cranes or Balearic cranes) contains two extant species in the crane family Gruidae: the black crowned crane (B. pavonina) and the grey crowned crane (B. regulorum).

The species today occur only in Africa, south of the Sahara Desert, and are the only cranes that can nest in trees. This habitat is one reason the relatively small Balearica cranes are believed to closely resemble the ancestral members of the Gruidae.

Like all cranes, they eat insects, reptiles, and small mammals.

== Taxonomy ==
The genus Balearica was erected by the French zoologist Mathurin Jacques Brisson in 1760 with the black crowned crane (Balearica pavonina) as the type species. The name is from the Latin Baliaricus for "of the Balearic Islands".

The crane family (Gruidae) is divided into the subfamily Gruinae of typical cranes and the subfamily Balearicinae of crowned cranes.

=== Extant species ===
Genus Balearica – Boetticher, 1947 – two species
Common name	Scientific name and subspecies	Range	Size and ecology	IUCN status and estimated population
Black crowned crane	Balearica pavonina (Brisson, 1760) Two subspecies: B. p. pavonina; B. p. ceciliae	Africa south of the Sahara	Size: Habitat: Diet:	VU 17,700–22,300
Grey crowned crane	Balearica regulorum (Bennett, 1834) Two subspecies: B. r. gibbericeps; B. r. regulorum	East of the Democratic Republic of the Congo and in Uganda, Angola south to South Africa	Size: Habitat: Diet:	EN 28,000–47,000

=== Fossil record ===
Crowned cranes seem to have been more widespread prehistorically. Compared to the true cranes, genus Grus, which were always common in the Holarctic and adjacent regions, the present genus appears to have had a more Atlantic distribution, ranging into Europe and North America; it is not known from the fossil record of Asia and South America, as none have yet been discovered.

- Balearica rummeli (Mlíkovský, J 1998) (Early Miocene of Germany) – formerly Basityto
- Balearica excelsa (Milne-Edwards, 1871) (Early–Middle Miocene of France) – formerly Grus and Ornithocnemus
- Balearica exigua Feduccia & Voorhies, 1992 (Miocene of Nebraska)
