= 1960 in paleontology =

List of years in paleontology	(table)
- … 1950; 1951; 1952; 1953; 1954; 1955; 1956; 1957; 1958; 1959; 1960; 1961; 1962; 1963; 1964; 1965; 1966; 1967; 1968; 1969; 1970 …
- In science 1957 1958 1959 1960 1961 1962 1963
- Art; Archaeology; Architecture; Literature; Music; Philosophy; Science; +...

Paleontology or palaeontology is the study of prehistoric life forms on Earth through the examination of plant and animal fossils. This includes the study of body fossils, tracks (ichnites), burrows, cast-off parts, fossilised feces (coprolites), palynomorphs and chemical residues. Because humans have encountered fossils for millennia, paleontology has a long history both before and after becoming formalized as a science. This article records significant discoveries and events related to paleontology that occurred or were published in the year 1960.

== Angiosperms ==
Name	Novelty	Status	Authors	Age	Unit	Location	Notes	Images
Eucommia brownii	Species	jr synonym	Becker	Late Eocene	Passamari Formation	USA (Montana)	Eucommia species, jr syn of Eucommia montana	

== Arthropods ==
=== Crustaceans ===
Name	Novelty	Status	Authors	Age	Unit	Location	Notes	Images
Eocypridina	Gen et sp nov	Valid	Kesling & Ploch	Upper Devonian	Blackiston Formation	US; Indiana	An ostracod, type species is E. campbelli	

== Molluscs ==
Name	Novelty	Status	Authors	Age	Unit	Location	Notes	Images
Ctenodonta spjeldnaesi.	Sp nov	synonym	Soot-Reyn & Soot-Reyn	Late Ordovician	Upper Chasmops Shale	Norway	transferred to Similodonta in 1964	

== Archosaurmopha ==
=== Dinosaurs ===
Data courtesy of George Olshevsky's dinosaur genera list.

Name	Status	Authors	Location	Notes	Images
Inosaurus	Nomen dubium.	Albert-Félix de Lapparent	Egypt	A dubious Theropod.	
Lophorhothon	Valid taxon.	Langston	USA (Alabama)		
Silvisaurus	Valid taxon.	Eaton	USA (Kansas)	A Nodosaur.	

=== Plesiosaurs ===
Name	Status	Authors	Notes
Woolungasaurus	Valid	Persson	

=== Birds ===
Name	Novelty	Status	Authors	Age	Unit	Location	Notes	Images
Anas pachyscelus	Sp. nov.	valid	Wetmore	Pleistocene	H. Bernard Wilkinson Quarry	USABermuda	An Anatidae.	
Baeopteryx latipes	Sp. nov.	synonym	Wetmore	Pleistocene	H. Bernard Wilkinson Quarry	USA Bermuda	A Gruid, moved to Grus latipes.	
Ergilornis rapidus	Gen. et Sp. nov.	valid	Kozlova	Early Oligocene	Hoyer-Dzan	Inner Mongolia	An Eogruid, type species E. rapidus	
Palaeospheniscus novaezealandiae	Sp. nov.	synonym	Marples	Late Pliocene - Waitotaran		New Zealand	A Spheniscidae, moved to Marplesornis novaezealandiae.	
Proergilornis minor	Gen. et Sp. nov.	synonym	Kozlova	Early Oligocene	Hoyer-Dzan	Inner Mongolia	An Eogruid, moved to Ergilornis minor.	

== Popular culture ==
=== Literature ===
- Pataud, le petit dinosaure was published. This was the first book about dinosaurs intended for an audience of children young enough to be new to reading. Paleontologist William A. S. Sarjeant has called it a "charmin[g]" book and "remarkable" that the earliest dinosaur book aimed at children was French since "French children do not share North American children's fascination" with dinosaurs.
