= Sinoergilornis =

Sinoergilornis Temporal range: Late Miocene

Scientific classification
- Kingdom: Animalia
- Phylum: Chordata
- Class: Aves
- Infraclass: Palaeognathae
- Order: Struthioniformes
- Family: †Eogruidae
- Genus: †Sinoergilornis
- Species: †S. guangheensis

Binomial name
- †Sinoergilornis guangheensis Musser et al., 2020

Extinct genus of birds

Sinoergilornis is an extinct genus of eogruid that lived during the Miocene epoch.

== Distribution ==
Fossils of S. guangheensis are known from the Liushu Formation.
