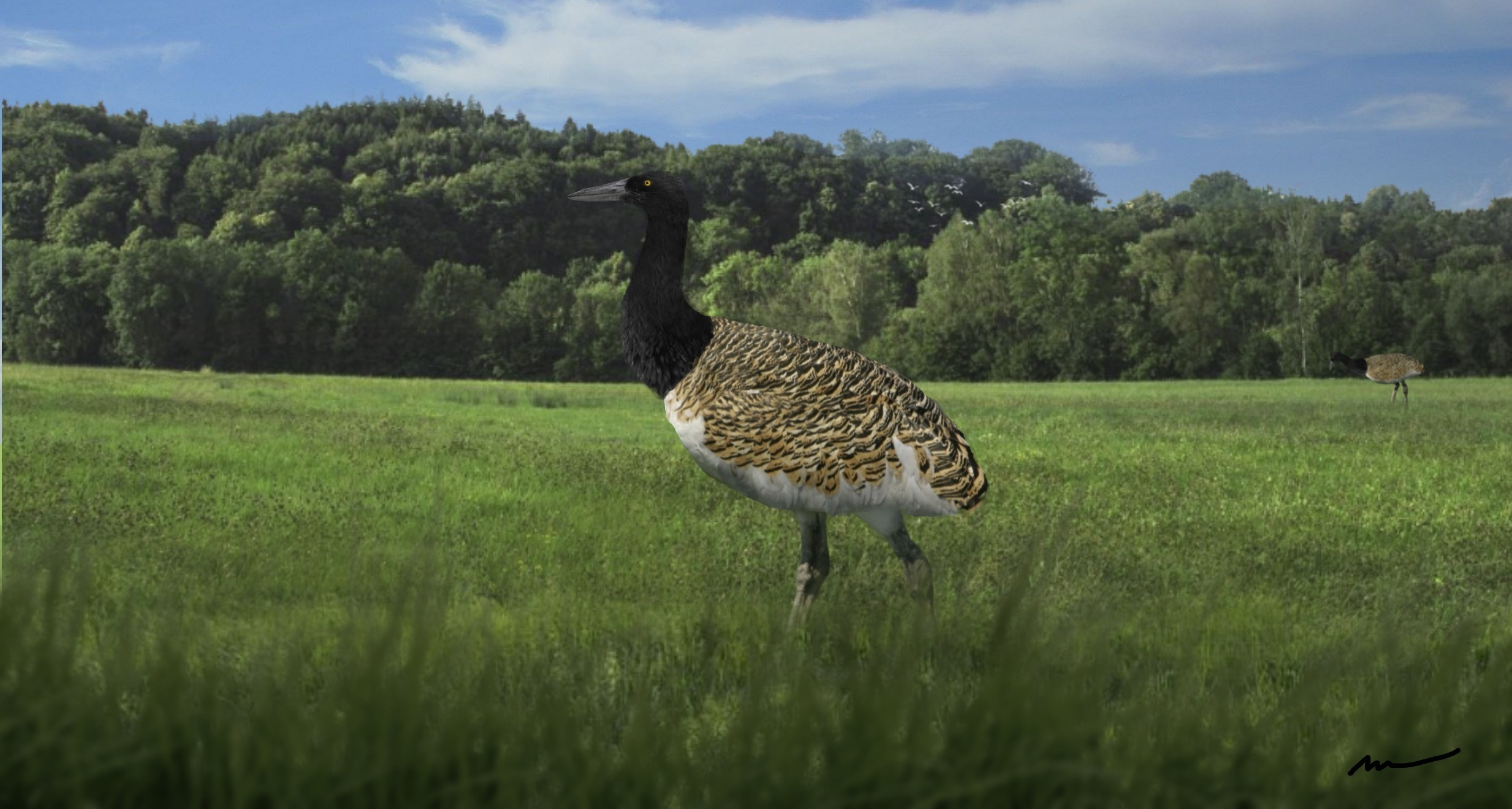
- Detailed depiction of Ergilornis in its habitat

Scientific classification
- Kingdom: Animalia
- Phylum: Chordata
- Class: Aves
- Infraclass: Palaeognathae
- Order: Struthioniformes
- Family: †Ergilornithidae; Kozlova, 1960

Genera
- †Amphipelargus; †Ergilornis; †Sinoergilornis; †Urmiornis

= Ergilornithidae =

Ergilornithidae Temporal range: Late Eocene–Early Pliocene

Extinct family of birds

Ergilornithidae is an extinct family of large, flightless birds related to modern ostriches. It was formerly regarded as Ergilornithinae, a subfamily of Eogruidae, but more recently as a family.

== Taxonomy ==
- †Ergilornithidae
  - †Ergilornis
    - †Ergilornis rapidus
    - †Ergilornis minor (Synonym/s - "Proergilornis")
  - †Amphipelargus
    - †Amphipelargus majori
    - †Amphipelargus cracrafti
    - †An unnamed species possibly within this genus.
  - †Urmiornis
    - †Urmiornis brodkorbi
    - †Urmiornis dzabghanensis
    - †Urmiornis maraghanus
    - †Urmiornis orientalis
    - †Urmiornis ukrainus
