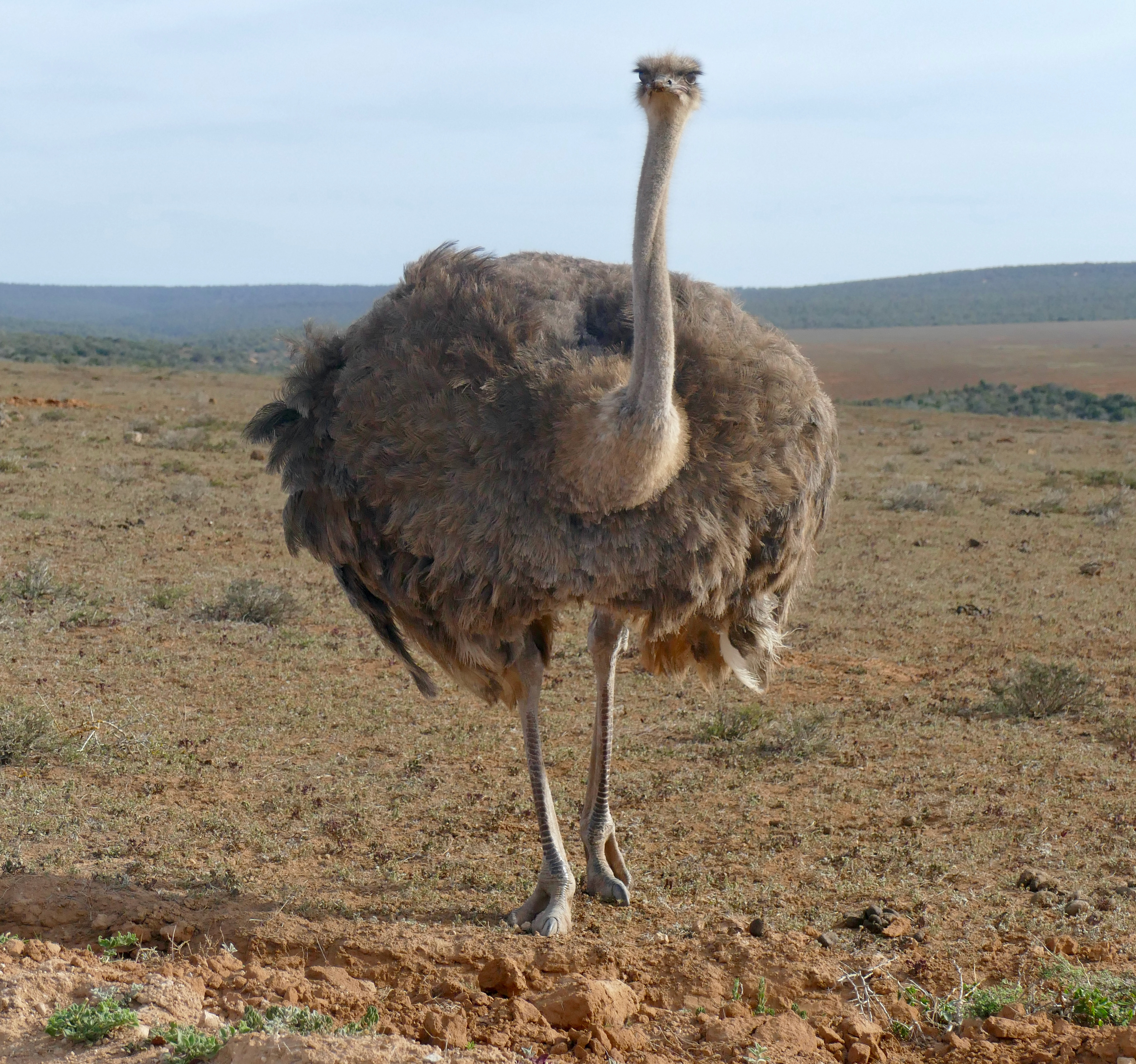
- Struthio camelus

Scientific classification
- Kingdom: Animalia
- Phylum: Chordata
- Class: Aves
- Infraclass: Palaeognathae
- Order: Struthioniformes; Latham, 1790

Families
- †Palaeotis; †Galligeranoides; †Geranoididae; †Eogruidae; †Ergilornithidae; Struthionidae

= Struthioniformes =

Struthioniformes Temporal range: Early Eocene–Recent

Order of birds

Struthioniformes is an order of birds with a single extant family, Struthionidae, containing the ostriches. Several other extinct families are known, spanning across the Northern Hemisphere, from the Early Eocene to the early Pliocene, including a variety of flightless forms like the Palaeotididae, Geranoididae, Eogruidae and Ergilornithidae, the latter two thought to be closely related to Struthionidae.

== Evolutionary history ==
According to Mayr and Zelenkov (2021), all Struthioniformes are united by the following characters: "a very long and narrow tarsometatarsus with short trochleae for the second and fourth toes, a tubercle next to the pons supratendineus on the distal end of the tibiotarsus, as well as a shortening of all non-ungual phalanges of the fourth toe except for the proximal one" All known members of the group are thought to have been flightless. Struthioniformes were widely distributed in the Northern Hemisphere during the Eocene, including Paleotididae from Europe, and Geranoididae from North America, and Eogruidae and Ergilornithidae in Asia. The discovery of Lumbreornis, belonging to either Paleotididae or Geranoididae, suggests that Struthiorniformes probably also inhabited South America during the Eocene. Ergilornthidae would persist in Asia into the Early Pliocene, while its sister group Struthionidae likely originated from Asia. Ostriches first appeared in Africa during the early Miocene, around 21 million years ago, before dispersing into Eurasia during the late Miocene, beginning around 12 million years ago.

== Taxonomy ==
After Mayr, and Zelenkov (2021)

- Palaeotididae (Early mid-Eocene, Europe)
  - Palaeotis
  - Galligeranoides
- Geranoididae (Early-mid Eocene, North America)
- Unnamed clade
  - Eogruidae (monotypic)
    - Eogrus (mid-Late Eocene, Asia)
  - Sonogrus (late Eocene, Asia)
  - Unnamed clade
    - Proergilornis (late Eocene, Mongolia)
    - Unnamed clade
      - Ergilornithidae (Late Eocene-Early Pliocene, Asia)
      - Struthionidae (Early Miocene-Recent, Afro-Eurasia)

== Gallery ==
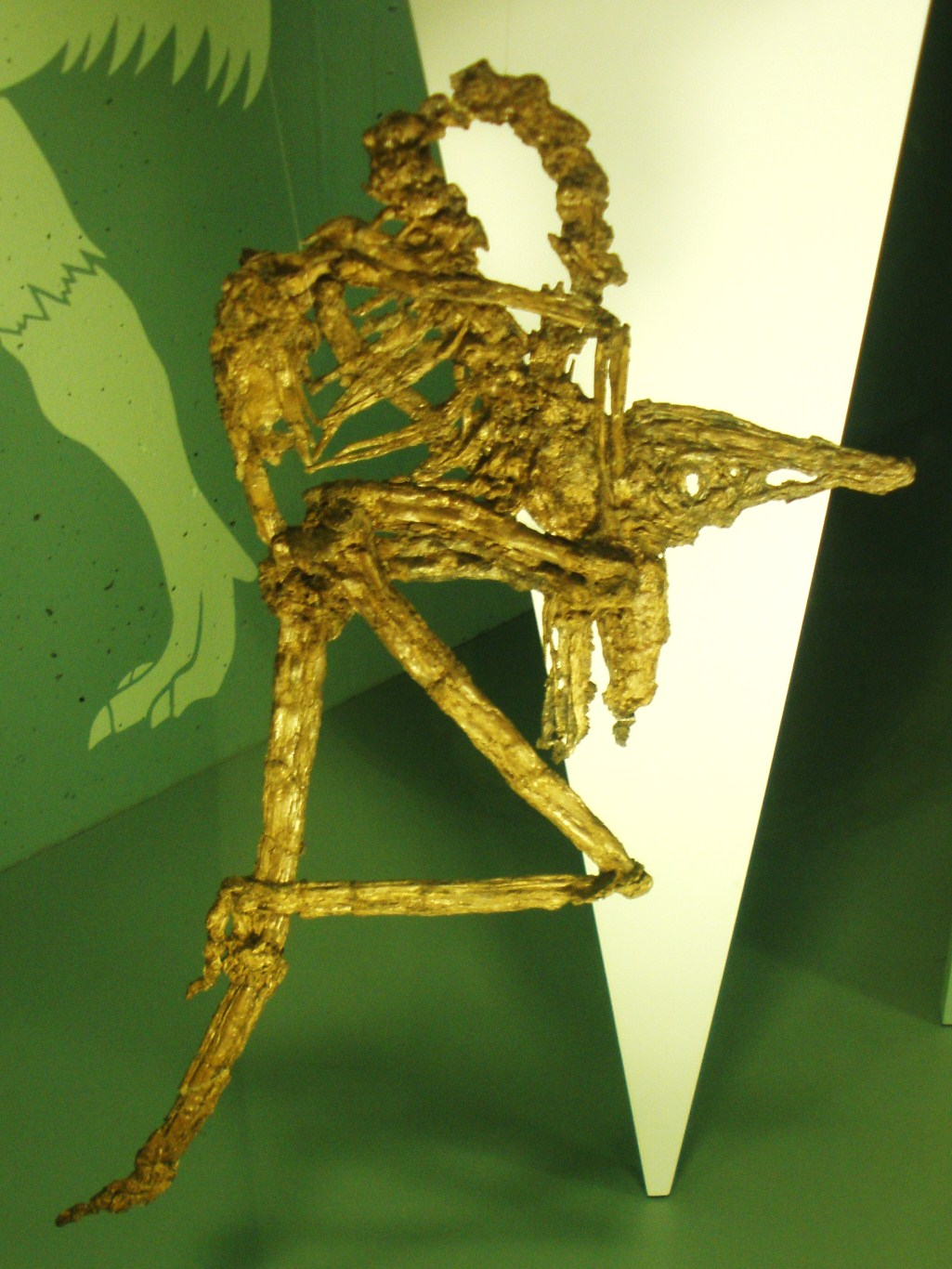
Skeleton of Palaeotis weigelti

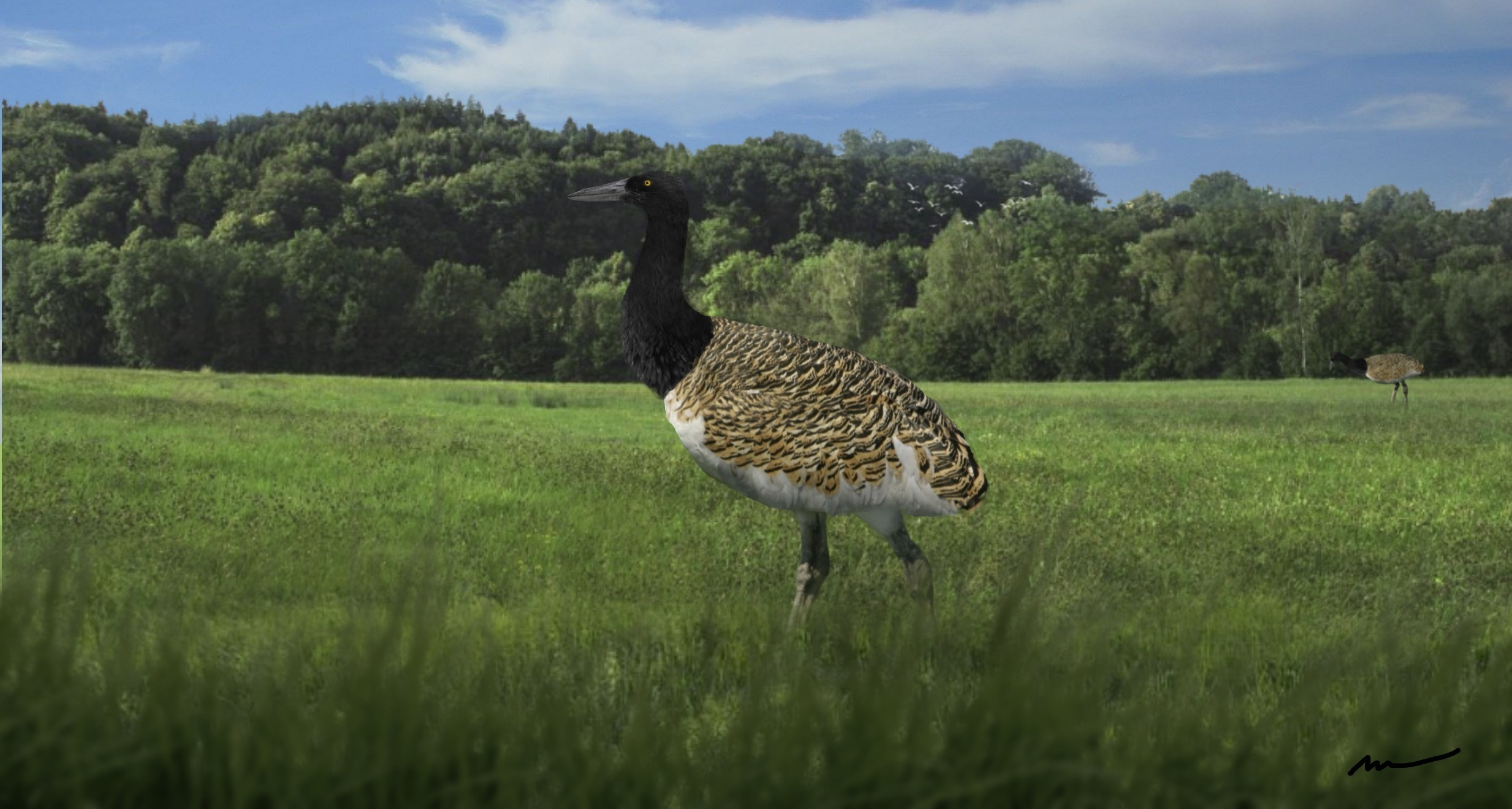
Life restoration of Ergilornis
