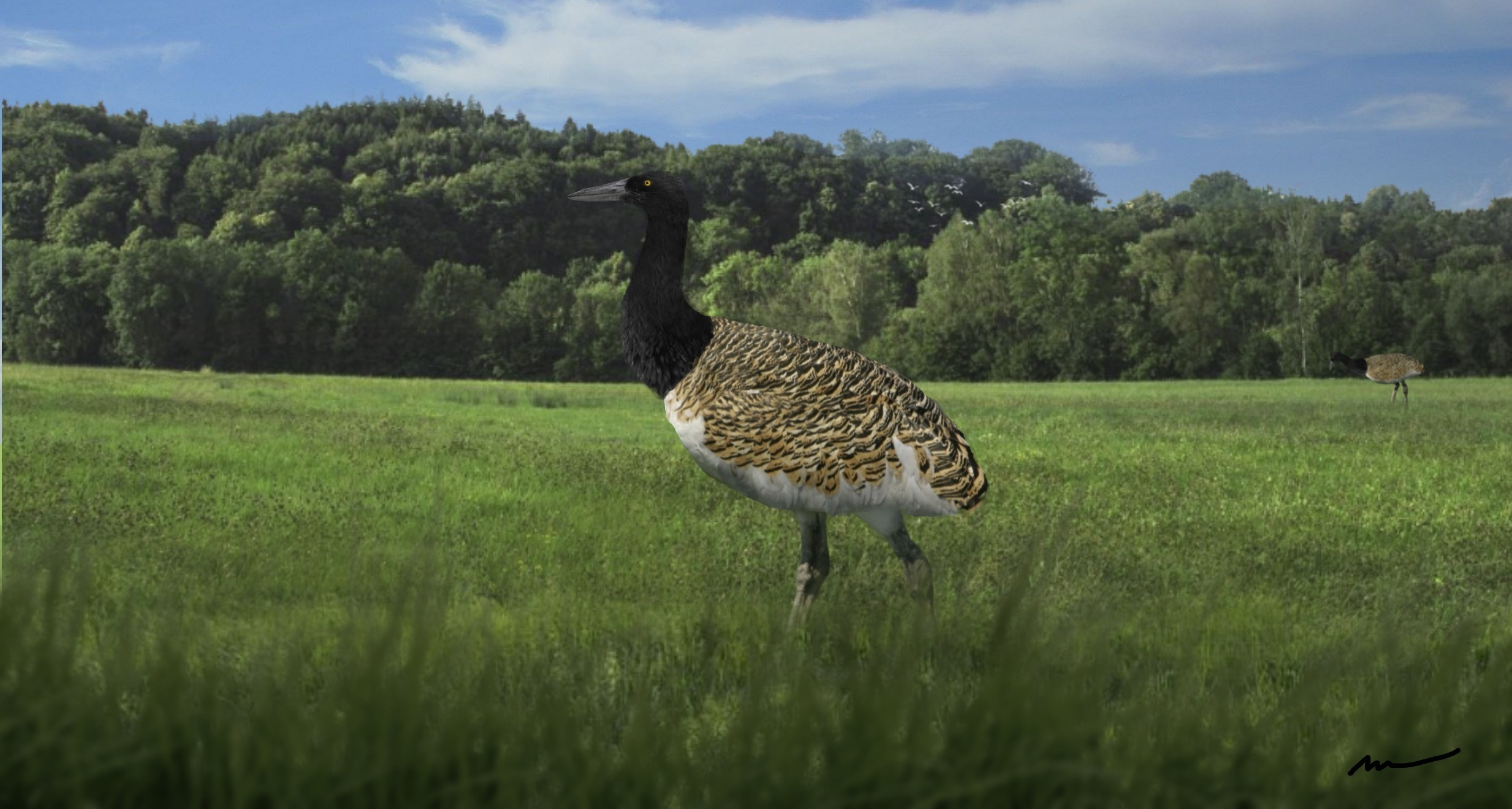
- Restoration of Ergilornis in its habitat

Scientific classification
- Kingdom: Animalia
- Phylum: Chordata
- Class: Aves
- Infraclass: Palaeognathae
- Order: Struthioniformes
- Family: †Ergilornithidae
- Genus: †Ergilornis; Elizabeth Kozlova, 1960

Type species
- †Ergilornis rapidus Kozlova, 1960

Species
- †E. rapidus Kozlova, 1960; †E. minor Kurochkin, 1981

Synonyms
- Proergilornis Kozlova, 1960

= Ergilornis =

Ergilornis Temporal range: Early Oligocene, 33–28 Ma

Extinct genus of flightless birds

Ergilornis is an extinct genus of eogruid bird from the early Oligocene of Mongolia. Remains have been found in the Ergilin Dzo Formation among other eogruids.

Ergilornis and other derived eogruid taxa were classified as a subfamily within Eogruidae, Ergilornithinae, but more recently as a separate family, Ergilornithidae.

== Description ==
Ergilornis was a large, probably cursorial bird. E. rapidus was around 1.2–1.5 m (3.9–4.9 ft) tall, with estimates of 1.6 m (5.2 ft) being doubtful.

Like other Eogruids, Ergilornis is known from sparse remains, including tarso-metatarsals and toes. Larger Eogruid forms like Ergilornis had highly reduced wings compared to other Struthioniformes, long legs adapted for running, and two toes per foot.

== Paleoecology ==
Both species of Ergilornis, E. rapidus and E. minor, are known from the Ergilin Dzo locality in the Ergilin Dzo Formation in what is now southeastern Mongolia. Other Eogruids are known from the Ergilin Dzo Formation, including Sonogrus gregalis and indeterminate remains of both Ergilornis and Eogrus.

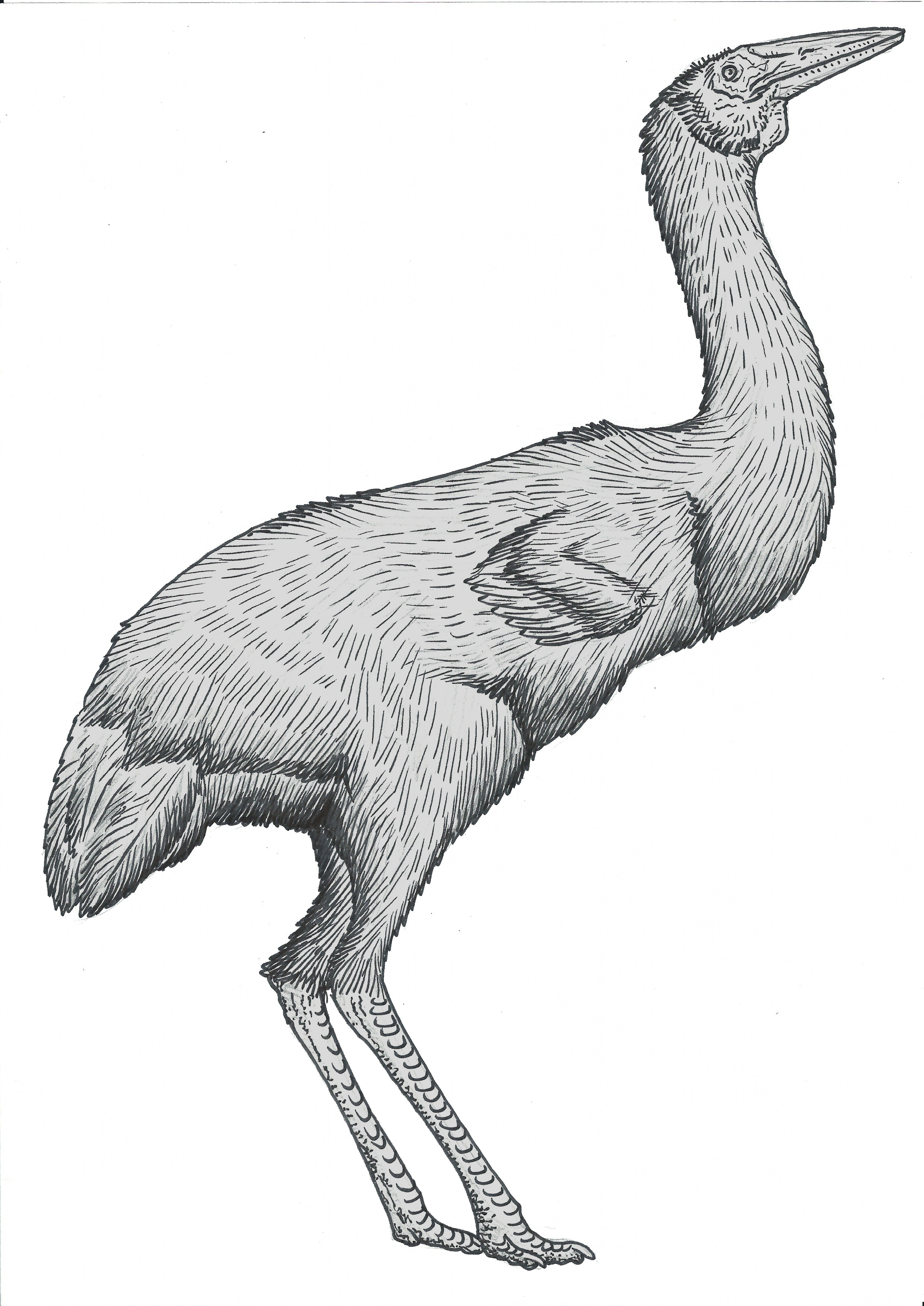
Ergilornis standing upright

The depositional environment of the Ergilin Dzo Formation has suggested a humid floodplain-like area, but more arid than faunal assemblages from Eurasia during this time. Ergilornis might have coexisted with the artiodactyls Entelodon gobiensis and Lophiomeryx angarae, the ferae Asiavorator gracilis, Hyaenodon eminus, Hyaenodon mongoliensis, and Hyaenodon pervagus, the mesonychian Mongolestes hadrodens, and the perissodactyls Eubrontotherium clarnoensis, Juxia borissaki, Schizotherium avitum, and Urtinotherium parvum.
