= Eogruidae =

Eogruidae Temporal range: Late Eocene–Early Pliocene

Scientific classification
- Kingdom: Animalia
- Phylum: Chordata
- Class: Aves
- Infraclass: Palaeognathae
- Order: Struthioniformes
- Family: †Eogruidae; Wetmore, 1934

Genera
- †Eogrus; †Sonogrus

Extinct family of birds

Eogruidae (also spelled Eogruiidae in some publications) is an extinct family of large, flightless birds that inhabited Asia from the Eocene to Pliocene epochs. Related to modern ostriches, it was formerly thought to be related to cranes, limpkins and trumpeters and that the similarities with ostriches were due to similar speciations to cursoriality, with both groups showing reduced numbers of toes to two in some taxa. It has been suggested that competition from true ostriches has caused the extinction of these birds, though this has never been formally tested and several ostrich taxa do occur in the late Cenozoic of Asia and some species do occur in areas where ostrich fossils have also been found. It has been suggested that the family is paraphyletic, with Ergilornithidae more closely related to modern ostriches than to Eogrus or Sonogrus.

== Description ==
Most eogruids are known from rather sparse remains, mostly the tarso-metatarsals and toes. The former are generally slender with a distinct crest along the lateral side of the plantar surface. The trochlea for the second toe shows a progressive reduction along the various taxa, culminating in its utter absence in Amphipelargus.

Other skeletal remains are rare. Wing elements are known in a few taxa; these are generally highly reduced, suggesting that these birds were flightless. The exception appears to be Eogrus itself, which does not show much phalange reduction and hypothetically could still fly, though the rest of the postcranial skeleton is already specialised for cursoriality.

== Classification ==
Eogruids were formerly considered to be Gruiformes within the crane-limpkin-trumpeter line, Gruoidea, the exception being Olson 1985 which declared them to be stem-ostriches. A study in 2021 based on newly described remains found that eogruids and the related Ergilornithidae are indeed members of Struthoniformes.

More derived taxa such as Ergilornis and Amphipelargus were once classified as a separate family, Ergilornithidae, but they are now generally accepted to be a full family. Eogruids are rather similar to Geranoididae, a clade of similar flightless gruiforms from North America and Europe, and both groups have occasionally been classified as sister taxa. Recently geranoidids have been recovered as basal to the rest of Gruoidea, however, while eogruids are sister-taxa to cranes.

=== Taxonomy ===
- †Eogrus
  - †Eogrus aeola
  - †Eogrus crudus
  - †Eogrus turanicus
- †Sonogrus
  - †Sonogrus gregalis
- †Proergilornis
